The conditional preservation of the saints, or conditional perseverance of the saints, or commonly conditional security, is the Arminian Christian belief that believers are kept safe by God in their saving relationship with him upon the condition of a persevering faith in Christ. Arminians find the Scriptures describing both the initial act of faith in Christ, "whereby the relationship is effected", and the persevering faith in him "whereby the relationship is sustained." The relationship of "the believer to Christ is never a static relationship existing as the irrevocable consequence of a past decision, act, or experience." Rather, it is a living union "proceeding upon a living faith in a living Savior." This living union is captured in the simple command by Christ, "Remain in me, and I in you".

According to Arminians, biblical saving faith expresses itself in love and obedience to God (Galatians 5:6; Hebrews 5:8–9). In the Remonstrant Confession of 1621, the first Remonstrants affirmed that true or living faith operates through love, and that God chooses to give salvation and eternal life through his Son, "and to finally glorify all those and only those truly believing in his name, or obeying his gospel, and persevering in faith and obedience until death".

Arminians believe that "It is abundantly evident from the Scriptures that the believer is secure." Furthermore, believers have assurance in knowing there is no  power or circumstance that can separate them from the love of God they enjoy in union with Christ (Romans 8:35–39; John 10:27–29). Nevertheless, Arminians see numerous warnings in Scripture directed to genuine believers about the possibility of falling away in unbelief and thereby becoming severed from their saving union with God through Christ. Arminians hold that if a believer becomes an unbeliever (commits apostasy), they necessarily cease to partake of the promises of salvation and eternal life made to believers who continue in faith and remain united to Christ.

Therefore, Arminians seek to follow the biblical writers in warning believers about the real dangers of committing apostasy. A sure and Biblical way to avoid apostasy is to admonish believers to mature spiritually in their relationship with God in union with Christ and through the power of the Spirit. Maturity takes place as Christ-followers keep on meeting with fellow believers for mutual encouragement and strength; exhorting each to love God and others; to continue growing in the grace and knowledge of their Lord and Savior Jesus Christ; and to persevere in faith in prayerful dependence upon God through various trials and temptations.

Historical background

Free Will Baptist scholar Robert Picirilli states:

Appropriately last among the points of tension among Calvinism and Arminianism is the question whether those who have been regenerated must necessarily persevere (or be preserved) or may apostatize and be lost. ... Arminius himself and the original Remonstrants avoided a clear conclusion on this matter. But they raised the question. And the natural implications of the views at the heart of Arminianism, even in its early stages as a formal movement, tended to question whether Calvinism's assumptions of necessary perseverance was truly Biblical. Those tendencies indicated by the questions raised did not take long to reach fruition, and thus Calvinism and Arminianism have come to be traditionally divided on this issue.

Prior to the time of the debate between Calvinists and the Arminians at the Synod of Dort (1618–1619), the view in the early church appears to be on the side of conditional security. From his research of the writings of the early church fathers (AD 90–313), patristic scholar David W. Bercot arrived at this conclusion: "Since the early Christians believed that our continued faith and obedience are necessary for salvation, it naturally follows that they believed that a 'saved' person could still end up being lost."

Arminius and conditional security
Jacobus Arminius (1560–1609) arrived at the same conclusion in his own readings of the early church fathers. In responding to Calvinist William Perkins arguments for the perseverance of the saints, he wrote: "In reference to the sentiments of the [early church] fathers, you doubtless know that almost all antiquity is of the opinion, that believers can fall away and perish." On another occasion he notes that such a view was never "reckoned as a heretical opinion," but "has always had more supporters in the church of Christ, than that which denies its possibility." Arminius' opinion on the subject is clearly communicated in this relatively brief statement:

My sentiments respecting the perseverance of the Saints are, that those persons who have been grafted into Christ by true faith, and have thus been made partakers of his life-giving Spirit, possess sufficient powers [or strength] to fight against Satan, sin, the world and their own flesh, and to gain the victory over these enemies—yet not without the assistance of the grace of the same Holy Spirit. Jesus Christ also by his Spirit assists them in all their temptations, and affords them the ready aid of his hand; and, provided they stand prepared for the battle, implore his help, and be not wanting to themselves, Christ preserves them from falling. So that it is not possible for them, by any of the cunning craftiness or power of Satan, to be either seduced or dragged out of the hands of Christ. But I think it is useful and will be quite necessary in our first convention, [or Synod] to institute a diligent inquiry from the Scriptures, whether it is not possible for some individuals through negligence to desert the commencement of their existence in Christ, to cleave again to the present evil world, to decline from the sound doctrine which was once delivered to them, to lose a good conscience, and to cause Divine grace to be ineffectual. Though I here openly and ingenuously affirm, I never taught that a true believer can, either totally or finally fall away from the faith, and perish; yet I will not conceal, that there are passages of scripture which seem to me to wear this aspect; and those answers to them which I have been permitted to see, are not of such a kind as to approve themselves on all points to my understanding. On the other hand, certain passages are produced for the contrary doctrine [of unconditional perseverance] which are worthy of much consideration.

For Arminius the believer's security is conditional—"provided they stand prepared for the battle, implore his help, and be not wanting to themselves." This complements what Arminius says elsewhere in his writings: "God resolves to receive into favor those who repent and believe, and to save in Christ, on account of Christ, and through Christ, those who persevere [in faith], but to leave under sin and wrath those who are impenitent and unbelievers, and to condemn them as aliens from Christ." In another place he writes: "[God] wills that they, who believe and persevere in faith, shall be saved, but that those, who are unbelieving and impenitent, shall remain under condemnation."

The Remonstrants and conditional security
After the death of Arminius in 1609, the Remonstrants maintained their leader's view on conditional security and his uncertainty regarding the possibility of apostasy. This is evidenced in the fifth article drafted by its leaders in 1610:

That those who are incorporated into Christ by a true faith, and have thereby become partakers of his life-giving Spirit, have thereby full power to strive against Satan, sin, the world, and their own flesh, and to win the victory; it being well understood that it is ever through the assisting grace of the Holy Ghost; and that Jesus Christ assists them through his Spirit in all temptations, extends to them his hand, and if only they are ready for the conflict, and desire his help, and are not inactive, keeps them from falling, so that they, by not craft or power of Satan, can be misled nor plucked out of Christ's hand, according to the Word of Christ, John 10:28: 'Neither shall any man pluck them out of my hand.'  But whether they are capable, through negligence, of forsaking again the first beginnings of their life in Christ, of again returning to this present evil world, of turning away from the holy doctrine which was delivered them, of losing a good conscience, of becoming devoid of grace, that must be more particularly determined out of the Holy Scripture, before we ourselves can teach it with full persuasion of our minds.

Sometime between 1610, and the official proceeding of the Synod of Dort (1618), the Remonstrants became fully persuaded in their minds that the Scriptures taught that a true believer was capable of falling away from faith and perishing eternally as an unbeliever. They formalized their views in "The Opinion of the Remonstrants" (1618). Points three and four in the fifth article read:

True believers can fall from true faith and can fall into such sins as cannot be consistent with true and justifying faith; not only is it possible for this to happen, but it even happens frequently. True believers are able to fall through their own fault into shameful and atrocious deeds, to persevere and to die in them; and therefore finally to fall and to perish.

Picirilli remarks: "Ever since that early period, then, when the issue was being examined again, Arminians have taught that those who are truly saved need to be warned against apostasy as a real and possible danger."

Other Arminians who affirmed conditional security

John Goodwin (1593–1665) was a Puritan who "presented the Arminian position of falling away in Redemption Redeemed (1651)" which drew a lot of attention from Calvinists. In his book, English bishop Laurence Womock (1612–1685) provides numerous scriptural references to the fifth article concerning perseverance delivered by the later Remonstrants. Philipp van Limborch (1633–1712) penned the first complete Remonstrant Systematic Theology in 1702 that included a section on apostasy. In 1710, a minister in the Church of England, Daniel Whitby (1638–1726), published a major work criticizing the five points of Calvinism—which involves their doctrine of unconditional perseverance.

John Wesley (1703–1791), the founder of Methodism, was an outspoken defender of conditional security and critic of unconditional security. In 1751, Wesley defended his position in a work titled, "Serious Thoughts Upon the Perseverance of the Saints." In it he argued that a believer remains in a saving relationship with God if he "continue in faith" or "endureth in faith unto the end." Wesley affirmed that a child of God, "while he continues a true believer, cannot go to hell." However, if he makes a "shipwreck of the faith, then a man that believes now may be an unbeliever some time hence" and become "a child of the devil." He then adds, "God is the Father of them that believe, so long as they believe. But the devil is the father of them that believe not, whether they did once believe or no." Like his Arminian predecessors, Wesley was convinced from the testimony of the Scriptures that a true believer may abandon faith and the way of righteousness and "fall from God as to perish everlastingly."

From John Wesley onward, it looks as if every Methodist/Wesleyan pastor, scholar, or theologian in print has opposed unconditional perseverance: Thomas Olivers (1725–1799); John William Fletcher (1729–1783); Joseph Benson (1748–1821); Leroy M. Lee (1758–1816); Adam Clarke (1762–1832); Nathan Bangs (1778–1862); Richard Watson (1781–1833); Thomas C. Thornton (1794–1860) Samuel Wakefield (1799–1895); Luther Lee (1800–1889); Amos Binney (1802–1878); William H. Browning (1805–1873); Daniel D. Whedon (1805–1885); Thomas N. Ralston (1806–1891); Thomas O. Summers (1812–1882); Albert Nash (1812–1900); John Miley (1813–1895); Philip Pugh (1817–1871); Randolph Sinks Foster (1820–1903); William Burt Pope (1822–1903); B. T. Roberts (1823–1893); Daniel Steele (1824–1914); Benjamin Field (1827–1869); John Shaw Banks (1835–1917); and Joseph Agar Beet (1840–1924).

Apostasy: definition and dangers

The definition of apostasy
Apostasy "means the deliberate disavowal of belief in Christ made by a formerly believing Christian." "Cremer states that apostasia is used in the absolute sense of 'passing over to unbelief,' thus a dissolution of the 'union with God subsisting through faith in Christ'." Arminian scholar Robert Shank writes,

The English word apostasy is derived from the Greek noun, apostasia. Thayer defines apostasia as 'a falling away, defection, apostasy; in the Bible sc. from the true religion.' The word appears twice in the New Testament (Acts 21:21, 2 Thessalonians 2:3). Its meaning is well illustrated in its use in Acts 21:21, ... "you are teaching apostasy (defection) from Moses." ... A kindred word is the synonym apostasion. Thayer defines apostasion, as used in the Bible, as "divorce, repudiation." "a bill of divorce [apostasion]." He also cites Matthew 5:31, ... "let him give her a bill of divorce [apostasion]." He cites the use of apostasion by Demosthenes as "defection, of a freedman from his patron." Moulton and Milligan cite the use of [apostasion] as a "bond of relinquishing (of property sold) ... a contract of renunciation ... the renunciation of rights of ownership." They also cite the use of apostasion "with reference to 'a deed of divorce.'" The meaning of the [related] verb aphistēmi ... is, of course, consonant with the meaning of the nouns. It is used transitively in Acts 5:37, ... "drew away people after him." Intransitively, it means to depart, go away, desert, withdraw, fall away, become faithless, etc.

I. Howard Marshall notes that aphistemi "is used of giving up the faith in Luke 8:13; 1 Timothy 4:1 and Hebrews 3:12, and is used of departure from God in the LXX [i.e., Septuagint, the Greek translation of the Old Testament]." Marshall also notes that "the failure to persist in faith is expressed by [other Greek] words which mean falling away, drifting and stumbling." Of particular theological significance are the verb skandalizō ("fall away from faith") and the noun skandalon ("enticement to unbelief, cause of salvation's loss, seduction").

Shank concluded: "An apostate, according to the New Testament definition, is one who has severed his union with Christ by withdrawing from an actual saving relationship with Him. Apostasy is impossible for men who have not entered into a saving relationship with God... The warnings against succumbing to the ugly peril of apostasy are directed ... to men who obviously are true believers." J. Rodman Williams adds,
One of the mistakes made by those who affirm the invariable continuance of salvation is the viewing of salvation too much as a "state." From this perspective, to be saved is to enter into "a state of grace." However true it is that one moves into a new realm—whether it is called the kingdom of God, eternal life, or other like expression—the heart of the matter is the establishment of a new relationship with God. Prior to salvation, one was "without God" or "against God," cut off from His presence. Now through Jesus Christ reconciliation—"at-one-ment with God"—has occurred. Moreover, the Holy Spirit, who becomes present, is not merely some force or energy but God Himself in a new and intimate relationship. Hence, if a person begins to "drift away," it is not from some static condition or "state" but from a Person. It is a personal relationship that thereby is betrayed, broken, forfeited; this is the tragic meaning of apostasy. It is not so much giving up something, even so marvellous as salvation, but the forsaking of a Person. Surely through such an action salvation too is forfeited. But the critical matter is the severing of a relationship with the personal God.

The dangers of apostasy
Marshall finds four biblical dangers that could serve as precursors to committing apostasy:

Marshall concludes: "The New Testament contains too many warnings about the danger of sin and apostasy for us to be complacent about these possibilities. ... These dangers are real and not 'hypothetical.'" Methodist scholar Ben Witherington would add: "The New Testament suggests that one is not eternally secure until one is securely in eternity. Short of that, there is the possibility of apostasy or rebellion against God by one who has believed in Christ. Apostasy, however, is not to be confused with the notion of accidentally or unconsciously "falling away." Apostasy is a conscious, wilful rebellion against God ... Unless one commits such an act of apostasy or rebellion, one need not worry about one's salvation, for God has a firm grip on the believer."

With apostasy being a real possibility for Christians, Arminians seek to follow the example that New Testament writer's provide in urging Christians to persevere. Scot McKnight clarifies what perseverance means and doesn't mean for Arminians:
It doesn't mean sinlessness; it doesn't mean that we are on some steady and never-failing incline up into pure sanctification; it does not deny stumbling or messy spirituality; it doesn't deny doubt and problems. It simply means that the person continues to walk with Jesus and doesn't walk away from him in a resolute manner. ... What it means is continuing trust in God.

Since Arminians view sin as "an act and attitude which ... constitutes a denial of faith", believers who persist in acting like unbelievers will eventually become one of them and share in their same destiny and doom. Therefore, "the only people who need perseverance are Christians," and "the only people who can commit apostasy are Christians. Non-Christians have nothing to persevere toward or apostatize from." Thus, when Christians are appropriately warned about the dangers of committing apostasy, such warnings "can function as a moral injunction that strengthens commitment to holiness as well as the need to turn in complete trust to God in Christ through his Spirit."

Biblical support

Below are many key Scriptures that Arminians have used to defend conditional security and the possibility of apostasy.

Conditional security in the Old Testament
 Deuteronomy 29:18–20 – "Make sure there is no man or woman, clan or tribe among you today whose heart turns away from the LORD our God to go and worship the gods of those nations; make sure there is no root among you that produces such bitter poison. When such a person hears the words of this oath, he invokes a blessing on himself and therefore thinks, 'I will be safe, even though I persist in going my own way.' ... The LORD will never be willing to forgive him; his wrath and zeal will burn against that man. All the curses written in this book will fall upon him, and the LORD will blot out his name from under heaven." (NIV)

Joseph Benson comments that no one among the people of God are to "revolt" from the Lord "to serve other gods." The person who does so is an "apostate from the true God" who is "spreading his poison to infect others." This apostate flatters himself into thinking that he is safe from the judgment of God while he does not "follow God's command," but his own devices. Moses warns the Israelites that their hopes of peace and safety will not "avail them at all if they forsook the law of God, and apostatized from his worship and service."

 2 Chronicles 15:1–2 – The Spirit of God came upon Azariah the son of Oded, and he went out to meet Asa and said to him, "Hear me, Asa, and all Judah and Benjamin: The LORD is with you while you are with him. If you seek him, he will be found by you, but if you forsake him, he will forsake you. (ESV)

"This is the settled and eternal purpose of God; to them who seek him he will ever be found propitious, and them alone will he abandon who forsake him. In this verse the unconditional perseverance of the saints has no place."

 Ezekiel 18:20–24 – "The soul who sins shall die. The son shall not bear the guilt of the father, nor the father bear the guilt of the son. The righteousness of the righteous shall be upon himself, and the wickedness of the wicked shall be upon himself. But if a wicked man turns from all his sins which he has committed, keeps all My statutes, and does what is lawful and right, he shall surely live; he shall not die. None of the transgressions which he has committed shall be remembered against him; because of the righteousness which he has done, he shall live. Do I have any pleasure at all that the wicked should die?" says the Lord GOD, "and not that he should turn from his ways and live? But when a righteous man turns away from his righteousness and commits iniquity, and does according to all the abominations that the wicked man does, shall he live? All the righteousness which he has done shall not be remembered; because of the unfaithfulness of which he is guilty and the sin which he has committed, because of them he shall die." (NKJV)
Can a man who was once holy and pure fall away so as to perish everlastingly? YES. For God says, "If he turn away from his righteousness;" . . . And he tells us, that a man may so "turn away from this," and so "commit iniquity," and "act as the wicked man," that his righteousness shall be no more mentioned to his account, than the sins of the penitent backslider should be mentioned to his condemnation; and "in the sin that he" this once righteous man, "hath sinned, and in the trespass that he hath trespassed, in them shall he die." . . . So then, God himself informs us that a righteous man may not only fall foully, but fall finally.

Conditional security in the teachings of Jesus
 Matthew 5:27–30 – [Jesus said] "You heard that it was said, 'You shall not commit-adultery'.  But I say to you that everyone looking at a woman so as to desire her already committed adultery with her in his heart. And if your right eye is causing you to fall [skandalizō], tear it out and throw it from you. For it is better for you that one of your body-parts perish and your whole body not be thrown into Gehenna. And if your right hand is causing you to fall [skandalizō], cut it off and throw it from you. For it is better for you that one of your body-parts perish and your whole body not go into Gehenna. (Disciples' Literal New Testament or DLNT)
The idea of gouging out [your right eye] and cutting off [your right hand], needless to say, demands a violent, decisive measure for removing the source of temptation. The reason is seen in "to fall away" [skandalizō], a strong term that does not simply indicate temptation to general sin but that which leads one virtually into apostasy. ... The seriousness of the sin is made even more so by the reference to "Gehenna" ... which implies the final judgment and eternal torment. Jesus wants to make certain that the disciples realize the importance of the issue. ... [I]t is far better to suffer in losing your most important appendage than to lose everything at the final judgment. ... [O]ne must violently throw away everything that causes the lust, lest their spiritual life and ultimately their eternal destiny be destroyed in the process.
 Matthew 7:21 – [Jesus said] "Not everyone saying to Me, 'Lord, Lord', will enter into the kingdom of the heavens, but the one doing the will of My Father in the heavens." (DLNT)
"[L]iving under the obedience to 'the will of [the] Father' (this is especially God's will as unfolded in the Sermon itself = the love commandments 22:37–40) is not an option but a necessity for entering the kingdom. A life of obedience ([note the] present tense [verb 'doing,' referring to] ... continuous action) to his will is, in fact, the definition of the 'greater righteousness' of 5:20."
 Matthew 10:16–17, 21–22 – [Jesus is speaking to his twelve disciples] "Behold, I am sending you out as sheep in the midst of wolves, so be wise as serpents and innocent as doves. Beware of men, for they will deliver you over to courts and flog you in their synagogues, and you will be dragged before governors and kings for my sake, to bear witness before them and the Gentiles. ... Brother will deliver brother over to death, and the father his child, and children will rise against parents and have them put to death, and you will be hated by all for my name’s sake. But the one who endures to the end will be saved." (ESV)
"[B]e not discouraged at the prospect of these trials, for he that perseveres in the faith and practice of the gospel, and who bears constantly and with invincible patience these persecutions, (which my grace is sufficient to enable you all to do,) shall be finally and eternally saved from all sin and misery, into the kingdom and glory of God."
 Matthew 10:32–33 – [Jesus is speaking to his disciples] "Therefore everyone who confesses Me before men, I will also confess him before My Father who is in heaven. But whoever denies Me before men, I will also deny him before My Father who is in heaven." (NASB)
"The term 'confess' ... here has the idea of public proclamation of allegiance to Jesus. ... Here the Son of Man on the throne confesses or denies people before the heavenly court.... [v. 33] But whoever denies me before people, I will also deny before my Father in heaven. ... This is a strong warning, for 'to deny' ... here means to renounce Christ and is language of apostasy. In this persecution passage, it means that people cave in to pressure and renounce Christ to avoid beating or death."
 Matthew 18:6-9 – [Jesus is speaking to his disciples] "But whoever causes one of these little ones believing in Me to fall [skandalizō]—it would be better for him that a donkey’s millstone be hung around his neck and he be sunk in the deep part of the sea. Woe to the world because of the causes-of-falling [skandalon]. For it is a necessity that causes-of-falling [skandalon] should come; nevertheless, woe to the person through whom the cause-of-falling [skandalon] comes. But if your hand or your foot is causing you to fall [skandalizō], cut it off and throw it from you. It is better for you to enter into life crippled or lame than to be thrown into the eternal fire having two hands or two feet. And if your eye is causing you to fall [skandalizō], tear it out and throw it from you. It is better for you to enter into life one-eyed than to be thrown into the Gehenna of fire having two eyes." (DLNT)
On the basis of the present context . . . it appears that the "little ones" are particularly vulnerable to temptation and apostasy. . . . [These] "little ones" are believers who are in danger of being "scandalized," that is, fall away from Christ (skandalizō is so used in 13:21; 24:10). Those responsible for causing little ones to fall away are threatened with eternal perdition. No hint is given concerning whether the skandalon (stumbling block) of verse 7 is laid before the humble believers by an outsider or an insider. Presumably both possibilities are in view; a vulnerable Christian can be drawn away by a non-Christian or driven away by a fellow believer. . . . Believers are here warned [in verses 8-9] to exercise proper self-discipline, since the end result of continually yielding to various temptations may well be turning away from Christ.
 Matthew 18:10-14 – [Jesus is speaking to his disciples] "Take heed that you do not despise one of these little ones, for I say to you that in heaven their angels always see the face of My Father who is in heaven. What do you think? If a man has a hundred sheep, and one of them goes astray, does he not leave the ninety-nine and go to the mountains to seek the one that is straying? And if he should find it, assuredly, I say to you, he rejoices more over that sheep than over the ninety-nine that did not go astray. Even so it is not the will of your Father who is in heaven that one of these little ones should perish." (NKJV)
Jesus delivers a parable about "believers . . . who can wander off into sin or false belief [cf. Matt. 18:6-9]." Jesus's disciples are to seek out and find a lost sheep (believer) who have gone astray from the flock (God's people) because God the Father values them and does not want them to ultimately "be lost forever" or perish. Lost/Perish (apollymi) in this context refers to falling into "eternal perdition," or "eternal doom because of apostasy." The wandering sheep needs to be "rescued before they commit apostasy" (i.e., become an unbeliever). But, "If he should find it," (v. 14) is significant here. Calvinist Craig Blomberg says, "'If' in v. 13 introduces a [Greek] third-class condition, which allows for the possibility that the shepherd will not find the sheep." "Verse 14 brings the parable to a conclusion with a dramatic theological assertion—the heavenly Father is not willing that any of these little ones be lost [eternally as unbelievers]. This shows God's concern that apostasy not happen to any of the followers of Jesus, but it also stresses that going astray is possible for the followers of Jesus." 
 Matthew 24:9–14 – [Jesus said to his disciples] "Then they will deliver you up to tribulation and put you to death, and you will be hated by all nations for my name's sake. And then many will fall away [skandalizō] and betray one another and hate one another. And many false prophets will arise and lead many astray. And because lawlessness will be increased, the love of many will grow cold. But the one who endures to the end will be saved. And this gospel of the kingdom will be proclaimed throughout the whole world as a testimony to all nations, and then the end will come." (ESV)
Jesus "predicts that many will fall away (... [skandalizō], 24:10a). ... Betrayals, hatred, deception, and failed love all characterize the ways believers will fall away from their faith." The future "forecast is bleak: many Christians will be deceived and become apostate. They will turn away from Jesus' command to love God and love their neighbor as themselves; they will 'hate one another' instead. The followers of Jesus must therefore persevere in faith to the end of the age or the end of their physical life, whichever comes first. Failure to do so would constitute apostasy and loss of eternal salvation."
 Matthew 24:42–51 – [Jesus is speaking to his disciples] "Therefore keep watch, because you do not know on what day your Lord will come. But understand this: If the owner of the house had known at what time of night the thief was coming, he would have kept watch and would not have let his house be broken into. So you also must be ready, because the Son of Man will come at an hour when you do not expect him. Who then is the faithful and wise servant, whom the master has put in charge of the servants in his household to give them their food at the proper time? It will be good for that servant whose master finds him doing so when he returns. Truly I tell you, he will put him in charge of all his possessions. But suppose that servant is wicked and says to himself, 'My master is staying away a long time,' and he then begins to beat his fellow servants and to eat and drink with drunkards. The master of that servant will come on a day when he does not expect him and at an hour he is not aware of. He will cut him to pieces and assign him a place with the hypocrites, where there will be weeping and gnashing of teeth." (NIV)
Jesus' teaching in Matthew 24:45–51 illustrates how "a servant who is left in charge of the master's home" can become unprepared for the master's return. Lutheran scholar Dale Bruner says: 
Jesus is not talking about two kinds of servants in our parable – one faithful, another unfaithful. The word "that" in the phrase "that wicked servant" certifies that we are dealing with the same servant, the one who was good in the preceding verses . . . and is therefore a warning: "Watch out, 'good servant,' for you can turn bad very quickly" (cf. Davies and Allison, 3:386). Jesus is talking about two possibilities (faithfulness or unfaithfulness) open to one servant (Jeremias, Par., 55; Schweizer, 463). He is talking about every Christian!
"The faithful and wise servant who devotedly feeds the household spiritual bread" does not need to worry about the time of Jesus' return. But that same servant may become "an apostate" by acting "in an unfaithful way, violating Jesus' love commandment by physically abusing fellow servants (cf. 22:37-41; 18:28-30) and getting drunk instead of staying alert (cf. Luke 21:34-36; 1 Thess 5:7; 1 Cor 6:10)." That servant will not be ready for his master's return and will be assigned a place with the hypocrites "where there is 'weeping and gnashing of teeth' (Matt 24:51b), a phrase in Matthew representing hell (Matt 8:12; 13:42, 50; 22:13; 25:30; cf. Luke 13:28)."
 Mark 8:34–38 – And He summoned the crowd with His disciples, and said to them, "If anyone wishes to come after Me, he must deny himself, and take up his cross and follow Me. For whoever wishes to save his life will lose it, but whoever loses his life for My sake and the gospel's will save it. For what does it profit a man to gain the whole world, and forfeit his soul? For what will a man give in exchange for his soul? For whoever is ashamed of Me and My words in this adulterous and sinful generation, the Son of Man will also be ashamed of him when He comes in the glory of His Father with the holy angels." (NASB)
In this teaching Jesus warns against an apostasy that is tied to persecution. He commands his disciples (and anyone who would want to be his disciple) to take up their cross in self-denial and to keep on following him (8:34). Jesus expects his disciples to follow him "on his journey to Jerusalem, and that path will involve suffering and death, but it will eventually produce new life when Jesus is raised from the dead." Jesus goes on to elaborate "on what cross-bearing entails: 'for whoever wishes to save his life will lose it, but whoever loses his life for my sake and the gospel's will save it' (Mark 8:35; cf. Matt 10:39; 16:25; Luke 9:24; 17:33; John 12:25). Here 'life' ... refers to the essential person that survives death. ...The saying in 8:35 encourages the disciples, especially when facing persecution and martyrdom, to look beyond the temporal life and receive eternal life, and conversely, it warns them against keeping their temporal life at the expense of losing eternal life. If a person should gain the entire world this would not be worth the value of his or her life in the age to come (8:36–37)." 
 Mark 9:42–50 – [Jesus is talking to his disciples] "And whoever causes one of these little ones believing in Me to fall [skandalizō]—it would be better for him if instead a donkey's millstone were lying around his neck, and he had been thrown into the sea. And if your hand should be causing you to fall [skandalizō], cut it off. It is better that you enter into life crippled than go into Gehenna having two hands—into the inextinguishable fire. And if your foot should be causing you to fall [skandalizō], cut it off. It is better that you enter into life lame than be thrown into Gehenna having two feet. And if your eye should be causing you to fall [skandalizō], throw it out. It is better that you enter into the kingdom of God one-eyed than be thrown into Gehenna having two eyes—where their worm does not come to an end, and the fire is not quenched." (DLNT)
"Jesus pronounces an ominous warning against influencing a believing child . . . to commit apostasy (v. 42)." Jesus does not specify "whether the person envisioned as causing this [skandalizō] is a believer or an unbeliever. ... [He] simply emphasize[s] that 'whoever' . . . causes a believer to ... lose his/her faith is in danger of being cast into hell" Jesus moves from warning anyone who is involved with causing believers to fall away, to warning His disciples that if their hand, foot, or eyes causes them to fall away (skandalizō) they are to "sever the member from their body rather than be thrown into Gehenna." This amputation of body parts "could hardly be more shocking . . . . Nothing less than eternal life and death are at stake" (entering into [eternal] life/the kingdom of God or being cast into hell). "Jesus . . . deliberately chose harsh, scandalous imagery to alert disciples that their lives tremble in the balance. ... [And] a lackadaisical disregard for sin in one's own life imperils one's salvation."
 Luke 8:11–13 – [Jesus said] "Now the parable is this: The seed is the word of God. The ones along the path are those who have heard; then the devil comes and takes away the word from their hearts, so that they may not believe and be saved. And the ones on the rock are those who, when they hear the word, receive it with joy. But these have no root; they believe for a while, and in time of testing fall away." (ESV)
The seed is the word of God, and the first place it has fallen is along the path. The initial group hear, but get no real hold on the word of God. The Devil has no difficulty in extricating it from their hearts. In their case, no response of faith has bound the message to their hearts ... which could have brought them salvation (cf. Acts 15:11; 16:31). The second group have a different problem. They "receive the word"—a mode of expression that indicates a right believing response to the gospel (Acts 8:14; 11:1; etc.). ... The real potential of these newly germinated plants will only come to light when the pressures come on in some kind of trial. Just as the true deep loyalties of Jesus were put on trial in Luke 4:1–13, so will those of every respondent to the Christian gospel also be. If the rootedness is not there, the new life will wither away. Apostasy is the outcome.
 Luke 12:42–46 – The Lord said [to his disciples], "Who then is the faithful and wise manager, whom the master will put in charge of his servants to give them their food allowance at the proper time? Blessed is that servant whom his master will find doing so when he comes. Truly I tell you: He will put him in charge of all his possessions. But if that servant says in his heart, 'My master is staying away for a long time.' And he begins to beat the male and female servants, to eat and drink and become drunk, then the master of that servant will arrive on a day when he was not expected and at an hour that his servant does not know. The master will cut him in two and assign him a place with the unbelievers. (EHV)
Some argue "that the unfaithful servant of verses 45, 46 was never a true disciple." However, this argument rests upon a false assumption. "First, it must be assumed that two different servants are in view in the parable, one of whom proves faithful, and the other of whom proves unfaithful. But Jesus did not speak of two servants. Rather, He spoke only of 'that servant' ho doulos ekeinos [in verses 43, 45, 46]. The demonstrative pronoun ekeinos ['that'] is emphatic. Language forbids any assumption that more than one servant is in view in the parable." Therefore,  "Jesus' parable . . . concerns only men who know Him and to whom He commits solemn responsibilities as His true disciples."
An accurate analysis of the parable is as follows:
The Question (v. 42): “Who then is the faithful and wise manager” whom his Lord will reward for giving His servants “their food allowance at the proper time?”
The Answer (v. 43): “that servant whom the master finds doing so when he returns.” 
The Reward (v. 44): “he will put him in charge of all his possessions.”
The Peril (v. 45): “That servant” may act unfaithfully during his master’s long absence by beating other servants and getting drunk.
The Penalty (v. 46): The master will come unexpectedly and “will cut him in two and assign him a place with the unbelievers” (or “unfaithful,” ESV, NET, CSB). 
The final destiny of the unbeliever/unfaithful is nothing other than "eternal damnation" in "hell."  If a disciple of Jesus persists in acting like an unbeliever while their master is gone, they will eventually become an unbeliever and share in their same fate when the master returns. This is a strong warning to the disciples of Jesus about the possibility of becoming "an apostate" through unfaithfulness manifested in selfish and sinful behavior.
 John 12:24–26 – [Jesus said] "Truly, truly, I say to you, unless a grain of wheat falls into the earth and dies, it remains alone; but if it dies, it bears much fruit. Whoever loves his life loses it, and whoever hates his life in this world will keep it for eternal life. If anyone serves me, he must follow me; and where I am, there will my servant be also. If anyone serves me, the Father will honor him." (ESV)
"After Jesus speaks about his upcoming death (12:23–24) he proclaims in 12:25, 'the one who loves his life loses it; the one who hates his life in this world will keep it for life eternal.'" Like "in the Synoptic texts. . . the saying is relevant to persecution and martyrdom, and a true disciple of Jesus must be willing to 'hate' his/her life in the sense of be willing to lose it for the sake of Jesus." Those "followers of Jesus who 'hate' their life keep it for eternal life." Those followers who wind up loving their life more than following Jesus during times of persecution will "fall away" and forfeit "eternal life." Thus, "Jesus warns his faithful followers against committing apostasy" in 12:25.
 John 15:1–6 – [Jesus is speaking to his eleven disciples minus Judas] "I am the true vine, and My Father is the vineyard keeper. Every branch in Me that does not produce fruit He removes, and He prunes every branch that produces fruit so that it will produce more fruit. You are already clean because of the word I have spoken to you. Remain in Me, and I in you. Just as a branch is unable to produce fruit by itself unless it remains on the vine, so neither can you unless you remain in Me. I am the vine; you are the branches. The one who remains in Me and I in him produces much fruit, because you can do nothing without Me. If anyone does not remain in Me, he is thrown aside like a branch and he withers. They gather them, throw them into the fire, and they are burned." (HCSB)
"Jesus speaks of two categories of branches: fruitless and fruitful. ... The branches that cease to bear fruit are those who no longer have the life in them that comes from enduring faith in and love for Christ. These "branches" the Father severs from the vine [v. 2], i.e., he separates them from vital union with Christ. When they stop remaining in Christ, they cease having life; thus they are severed and thrown into the fire (v. 6). "This verse shows ...there may therefore occur ... a real apostasy of such as have been really disciples of Jesus. ... He who apostatizes [i.e., becomes an unbeliever] is cast out, namely, out of the vineyard of the kingdom of God. The casting comes only after the apostasy, but it comes surely. But cut from the vine and thrown away, the branch has but for a short time the life-sap in itself; it will at once be said ... ('it is withered'). ... The rest, then, is the ... ('gathering,' 'throwing into the fire,' and 'burning'), that is, the final judgment." Jesus "makes it unmistakably clear" that he "did not believe 'once in the vine, always in the vine.' Rather, ... Jesus gave his disciples a solemn but loving warning that it is indeed possible for true believers to ultimately abandon the faith, turn their backs on Jesus, fail to remain in him, and thus be thrown into the everlasting fire of hell."

Conditional security in the book of Acts
 Acts 14:21–22 – They [Paul and Barnabas] preached the gospel in that city and won a large number of disciples. Then they returned to Lystra, Iconium and Antioch, strengthening the disciples and encouraging them to remain true to the faith. "We must go through many hardships to enter the kingdom of God," they said. (NIV)
Paul's follow-up care with new Christians involved warning them about necessity of enduring hardships. "Hardship is a key ingredient of discipleship. Paul also teaches this in his letters, and Jesus mentioned it in his basic call to discipleship." Paul asserts that enduring hardships "is a condition for entrance into the kingdom of God." All the "strengthening" and "encouraging them to remain true to the faith" was for the purpose of enabling them to persevere in faith through the coming hardships that Jesus and Paul said was a normal part of being a follower of Jesus.
 Acts 20:28–32 – Watch out for yourselves and for all the flock of which the Holy Spirit has made you overseers, to shepherd the church of God that he obtained with the blood of his own Son. I know that after I am gone fierce wolves will come in among you, not sparing the flock. Even from among your own group men will arise, teaching perversions of the truth to draw the disciples away after them. Therefore, be alert, remembering that night and day for three years I did not stop warning each one of you with tears. And now I entrust you to God and to the message of his grace. This message is able to build you up and give you an inheritance among all those who are sanctified. (NET)
Paul warns the elders in Ephesus to be on the alert and to watch out for yourselves and for God's flock, for there is coming a time when fierce wolves will come to prey upon God's people from without and from within. These false teachers will pervert the truth of the gospel message in hopes of drawing away "Christian believers (from the faith)"—persuading them to "apostatize." Shockingly, some of the elders "will become apostate" "false teachers" who "seduce their congregation members away from the Christian message." Luke's "inclusion of the warning in Acts 20" would have put his readers on high alert regarding the "dangerous teachers situated within the Christian community that lead believers away from apostolic faith."

Conditional security in the writings of the apostle Paul
 Romans 8:12–13 – So then, brethren, we are under obligation, not to the flesh, to live according to the flesh—for if you are living according to the flesh, you must die; but if by the Spirit you are putting to death the deeds of the body, you will live. (NASB)
"Paul here directs this warning specifically to his 'brothers' (v. 12). He is not speaking of an anonymous 'anyone' (v. 9) who is not a true Christian, but is speaking directly to these brothers in second person plural: 'If you live according to the flesh, you will die.' 'Die' cannot mean die physically, for that will happen regardless. Thus it means die spiritually by reverting to an unsaved condition; or die eternally in hell. Actually these cannot be separated." "If the believer allow flesh's impulses to get the upper hand again, he faces the awful prospect of apostasy and eternal death (cf. 2 Peter 2:19–22)."
 Romans 11:19–21 – Then you will say, "Branches were cut off so that I could be grafted in." That's right! They were broken off because of their unbelief, but you remain only because of faith. Do not be arrogant, but be afraid! For if God did not spare the natural branches, he certainly will not spare you either. Consider, then, the kindness and severity of God: his severity toward those who fell, but God's kindness toward you—if you continue in his kindness. Otherwise, you too will be cut off. (ISV)
verses 20—22 involve clearly an emphatic contradiction of the teaching, by Calvin and others, that all who have been justified will ultimately be saved. For Paul assumes throughout that his readers are already justified, are adopted as sons and heirs of God, and possess the Spirit of God as a firstfruit of their inheritance: see chapters 5:9-11; 6:18, 22; 8:2, 15, 16, 23. Yet he solemnly and emphatically warns them that unless they continue in the kindness of God they will be cut off. This last can be no less than the punishment already inflicted on the unbelieving Jews who have been broken off, and who are held up in verse 20, 21 as a warning to the believing Gentiles. For Paul's deep sorrow for the unbelieving Jews proves clearly that in his view they are on the way to the destruction (chapter 2:12) awaiting unrepentant sinners. His warning to Gentiles who now stand by faith implies clearly that unless they continue in faith they will experience a similar fate. We therefore accept the words before us in their simple and full meaning. Although salvation, from the earliest good desire to final victory, is entirely a work of God, a gift of His undeserved favor, and a realisation of His eternal purpose, it is nevertheless, both in its commencement and in its continuance, altogether conditional on man's faith.
 Romans 14:13–23 – Therefore, let us stop passing judgment on one another. Instead, make up your mind not to put any stumbling block or obstacle in your brother's way. As one who is in the Lord Jesus, I am fully convinced that no food is unclean in itself. But if anyone regards something as unclean, then for him it is unclean. If your brother is distressed because of what you eat, you are no longer acting in love. Do not by your eating destroy your brother for whom Christ died. Do not allow what you consider good to be spoken of as evil. For the kingdom of God is not a matter of eating and drinking, but of righteousness, peace and joy in the Holy Spirit, because anyone who serves Christ in this way is pleasing to God and approved by men. Let us therefore make every effort to do what leads to peace and to mutual edification. Do not destroy the work of God for the sake of food. All food is clean, but it is wrong for a man to eat anything that causes someone else to stumble. It is better not to eat meat or drink wine or to do anything else that will cause your brother to fall. So whatever you believe about these things keep between yourself and God. Blessed is the man who does not condemn himself by what he approves. But the man who has doubts is condemned if he eats, because his eating is not from faith; and everything that does not come from faith is sin. (NIV, 1984)
The strong Christian is warned not to place a stumbling block (. . . proskomma) or an obstacle (... skandalon) in a brother's path…. The stumbling in this verse is spiritual … it refers to stumbling and falling into sin…. It refers to ... a true "spiritual downfall" (Moo, 851). The cause for such spiritual stumbling would be an act on the part of the strong brother that is not wrong in itself, but which is perceived as wrong by a weak brother. Such an act becomes a stumbling block when the weak brother observes it and is influenced there by to do the same thing, even though in his heart he believes it is wrong, which is sin (v. 23). In this way the strong brother has inadvertently influenced the weak brother to "fall into sin and potential spiritual ruin" (Moo, 852), just by exercising his Christian liberty. The point is that we must be sensitive to how our conduct is affecting others, and we must be willing to forgo perfectly legitimate behavior if it has the potential of causing someone to sin against his conscience…. In v. 13 Paul urges the strong Christian to not put a stumbling block in the way of the weak; here in v. 15 he gives one reason for this, i.e., it is not consistent with love. ... To the one who loves, a weak brother's spiritual well-being is always more important than indulging the right to eat whatever one likes…. [O]ne is not acting in love if his exercise of liberty influences a weak brother to follow his example and thus fall into sin by violating his own conscience. [Paul goes on to write:] Do not by your eating destroy your brother for whom Christ died. The Greek word for "destroy" is ... (apollymi), a very strong word …. Just how serious is this destruction? Is Paul referring to a loss of salvation, and condemnation to hell? … I must conclude … that this strong warning does imply that the careless and unloving exercise of Christian liberty can lead to actual loss of salvation for a weak brother. Apollymi is frequently used in the sense of eternal destruction in hell (e.g., Matt 10:28; Luke 13:3; John 3:16; Rom 2:12). The reference to the fact that Christ died for these weak brethren supports this meaning here. I.e., the destruction in view would negate the very purpose of Christ's death, which is to save them from eternal condemnation…. The verse cannot be reconciled with "once saved, always saved."
 
 Romans 16:17–20 – I urge you, brothers, to watch out for those who cause divisions and put obstacles in your way that are contrary to the teaching you have learned. Keep away from them. For such people are not serving our Lord Christ, but their own appetites. By smooth talk and flattery they deceive the minds of naive people. Everyone has heard about your obedience, so I am full of joy over you; but I want you to be wise about what is good, and innocent about what is evil. The God of peace will soon crush Satan under your feet. The grace of our Lord Jesus be with you. (NIV, 1984)
Paul warns the Roman Christians about false teachers before they ever appear in the community. ... He commands them to watch out or maintain constant vigilance regarding the dangerous heretics who may come at any time. The first problem with these people is that they cause divisions or "dissension" in the community. ... Second they put obstacles or "stumbling blocks" before believers. ... these are forces [i.e., teachings] that destroy one's faith and can lead to apostasy. This is in fact a primary characteristic of heresy. It ... actually destroys the core doctrines of the Christian faith.
 1 Corinthians 3:16–17 – Don't you know that you yourselves are God's temple and that God's Spirit dwells in your midst? If anyone destroys God's temple, God will destroy that person; for God's temple is sacred, and you together are that temple. (NIV)
Since this community building is the temple of God, where the Spirit of God dwells, Paul introduces a new, more serious threat. While some builders may do a lousy job of building on the foundation and their work will be consumed, some work moves beyond mere shoddiness and becomes destructive. Paul assumes that the community can be destroyed by insiders, not by outsiders... It is a severe warning. He has real destruction in mind, and those who destroy God's temple will also be destroyed…. Paul does not describe how the temple is destroyed, but it is undoubtedly relates in some way to their boastful arrogance, their eagerness to appraise others, and their competitive partisanship—all the things that divide Christ... Paul allows the readers to imagine that their petty jealousies (3:3), boasting (1:29; 3:21; 4:7), arrogance (4:6, 18, 19), and quarrels (1:11; 3:3) might qualify for this bleak judgment. The survival of the church and their salvation is at risk.
 1 Corinthians 6:7–11 – The very fact that you have lawsuits among you means you have been completely defeated already. Why not rather be wronged? Why not rather be cheated? Instead, you yourselves cheat and do wrong, and you do this to your brothers. Do you not know that the wicked will not inherit the kingdom of God? Do not be deceived: Neither the sexually immoral nor idolaters nor adulterers nor male prostitutes nor homosexual offenders nor thieves nor the greedy nor drunkards nor slanderers nor swindlers will inherit the kingdom of God. And that is what some of you were. But you were washed, you were sanctified, you were justified in the name of the Lord Jesus Christ and by the Spirit of our God. (NIV, 1984)
The 'wicked' will not inherit the kingdom of God." This is of course refers to the eschatological [i.e., future and final] consummation of the kingdom…. Paul's point in all this it to warn "the saints," … that if they persist in the same evils as the "wicked" they are in the same danger of not inheriting the kingdom. Some theologies have great difficulty with such warnings, implying that they are essentially hypothetical since God's children cannot be "disinherited." But such a theology fails to take seriously the genuine tension of texts like this one. The warning is real; the wicked will not inherit the kingdom…. Paul's concern is that the Corinthians must "stop deceiving themselves" or "allowing themselves to be deceived." By persisting in the same behavior as those already destined for judgment they are placing themselves in the very real danger of that same judgment. If it were not so, then the warning in no warning at all.
 1 Corinthians 8:9–13 – But be watching-out that this right of yours does not somehow become an opportunity-for-stumbling to the weak ones. For if someone sees you, the one having knowledge, reclining [to eat] in an idol-temple, will not his conscience, being weak, be built-up so as to eat the foods-sacrificed-to-idols? For the one being weak is being destroyed by your knowledge— the brother for the sake of whom Christ died! And in this manner sinning against the brothers and striking their conscience while being weak, you are sinning against Christ. For-this-very-reason, if food causes my brother to fall, I will never eat meats, ever—in-order-that I may not cause my brother to fall. (DLNT)
Paul solemnly warns [Christians] of the danger of dabbling with idolatrous practices. Verse 10–12 offer a specific description of how Paul imagines the possible damage inflicted on the community by those who want to eat the idol meat. The weak will see the gnōsis [knowledge]-boasters eating in the temple of an idol and be influenced, contrary to their own consciences, to participate in the same practice (v. 10)…. [Paul] is concerned … about weaker believers … being drawn … back into idol worship…. In verse 11 Paul states the dire consequences of such cultural compromise: The weak will be "destroyed" [apollymi]. This language should not be watered down.
David Garland states: "Paul always uses the verb [apollymi] to refer to eternal, final destruction ([So] Barrett 1968: 196; Conzelmann 1975: 149 n. 38; Fee 1987: 387-88; Schrage 1995: 265; Cheung 1999: 129). If salvation means that God has 'rescued us from the power of darkness and transferred us into the kingdom of his beloved Son' (Col. 1:13), then returning to idolatry and the regime of darkness means eternal ruin." Robert Picirilli notes that "the verb [apollymi] is present tense ... 'Your brother is perishing.' (This use of the present is futuristic, of course, but it puts the future into the present time as something already in process.) Paul does not mean that this weak brother has perished yet; but he does mean that the outcome of his falling into sin, if the process is not reversed in some way, is certain to be his eternal ruin." Picirilli concludes: "Sin persisted in, on the part of a Christian, can lead to a retraction of faith in Christ and thus to apostasy [i.e., becoming an unbeliever] and eternal destruction."
 1 Corinthians 9:24–27 – Do you not know that the runners in a stadium all race, but only one receives the prize? Run in such a way that you may win. Now everyone who competes exercises self-control in everything. However, they do it to receive a perishable crown, but we an imperishable one. Therefore, I do not run like one who runs aimlessly, or box like one who beats the air. Instead, I discipline my body and bring it under strict control, so that after preaching to others, I myself will not be disqualified. (HCSB)
Paul issues an imperative "Be running in such a way that you may win [the prize]" (9:24b, DLNT), which controls the whole paragraph. The command ("be running") suggests that some believers are not running the Christian race in such a way to win the prize. Specifically, some are not "exercising proper self-control (the emphasis in vv. 25-27)" in their Christian walk. Some Christians are demonstrating a lack of self-control in regards to knowingly eating food offered to idols in a pagan temple and influencing other Christians to engage in such idolatry as well (see 1 Cor. 8:7-13). This passage "serves as a clear warning if they fail to 'run' properly," and anticipates the warnings found in 10:1-22. The goal of running with self-control for the believer is an imperishable prize which commentators and scholars identify as: "final salvation" or "eternal life" with God, or more specifically, "eternal life in an imperishable new body (15:42, 50, 53-54)." Gregory Lockwood concludes:
Buy thus disciplining himself, Paul's faith was active in loving service to all. If he were to live a life of self-indulgence, he would endanger not only the salvation of others, but also his own. The danger of being disqualified is real. Disqualification would mean nothing less than missing out on the crown of [eternal] life, as the context makes clear (1 Cor 9:24–27). ... The implication for the Corinthians should be obvious: it would be a tragedy if they forfeited their salvation by ceasing to exercise self-control and thus relapsing into idolatry. Paul will now elaborate that message in 1 Corithians 10. Christians must constantly exercise self-discipline, restraining their sinful nature and putting it to death by the power of the Spirit, so that they may live for God—now and in eternity (Rom 8:13).
 1 Corinthians 10:1-12 – For I do not want you to be ignorant, brothers, that our fathers  were all under the cloud and all went through the sea, and all were baptized into Moses in the cloud and in the sea, and all ate the same spiritual food, and all drank the same spiritual drink. For they drank from the spiritual rock that followed them, and the rock was Christ. But God was not pleased with the majority of them, for they were struck down in the desert. Now these things happened as examples for us, so that we should not be desirers of evil things, just as those also desired them, and not become idolaters, as some of them did, just as it is written, "The people sat down to eat and drink, and stood up to play," nor commit sexual immorality, as some of them committed sexual immorality, and twenty-three thousand fell in one day, nor put Christ to the test, as some of them tested him, and were destroyed by snakes, nor grumble, just as some of them grumbled, and were destroyed by the destroyer. Now these things happened to those people as an example, but are written for our instruction, on whom the ends of the ages have come. Therefore, the one who thinks that he stands must watch out lest he fall. (Lexham English Bible)
The connecting word "For" is significant because it links "the argument of chapter 10 to chapter 9. The danger of being 'disqualified' from salvation (9:27) is real, as the history of Israel proves." Both 1 Cor. 9:24–27 and 10:1–12 convey "the necessity for self-control and [warn of] the danger of apostasy," via idolatry. Paul "appeals to ... the history of Israel as directly applicable to Christians in Corinth. The example of 'the fathers' horrifying end highlights the peril in which the Corinthians place themselves by consorting with idols." "Paul's purpose in drawing the parallel is this: just as many Israelites were disqualified because of their unfaithfulness and false worship, Christians too face the danger of being disqualified from salvation if they engage in false worship and fail to remain in repentance and faith worked by the Holy Spirit." "Paul uses the Israelite examples so that the Corinthians will repent and not perish" due to their idolatrous actions. Paul gives a "climatic" and "chilling warning" to his readers in verse 12, "Therefore, the one who thinks that he stands must watch out lest he fall" (LEB). In Pauline usage "stand" (Greek: histēmi) refers to "the idea of one's standing in faith and grace or in the message of the Gospel (1 Cor. 15:1f; 16:13; 2 Cor. 1:24; Rom. 5:2; 11:20; Phil. 4:1 cf. 1 Pet. 5:12)." Here, in light of "the divine privileges found in 10:1–4" that the Christians in Corinth already partake of, histēmi conveys in v. 12 that they are presently "standing in a salvific relationship" with Christ and enjoy "the blessings of divine graces." Unfortunately, some Christians are "forgetting that their standing is not indelible [i.e., permanent] but depends on a continuing faithfulness to God." "If Paul thinks that he could fall (9:27), how much more, then, could the Corinthians fall. Their security rests on their continuing fidelity [i.e., faithfulness] to God and God alone (cf. Rom. 11:22)." "When congregants have an overinflated view of salvific assurance . . . Paul is quick to deflate them by warning that they may not achieve final salvation if they persist in ways that displease God (e.g., 1 Cor 10:1–12)." Indeed, "The sins specified by Paul are ... those peculiarly besetting the Church at Corinth. They are to be interpreted as sins through which apostasy and destruction were likely to result. Hence Paul warns them (verse 12) against a fall." This "fall" is not merely "a falling ... into a state of sin" since some Christians in Corinth have already been committing the sins mentioned in 10:6-10, specifically, idolatry and sexual immorality. Since "fall" is the opposite of standing in faith, Paul is referring to a "catastrophic fall" from faith whereby the believer commits apostasy (i.e., becomes an unbeliever). Even Calvinist Thomas Schreiner acknowledges that "the verb 'fall' (piptō) often designates apostasy – falling away from the faith," but does not believe that this can happen to Christians. Calvinist Andrew Wilson says, "Standing and falling, for Paul, appear to be common metaphors for perseverance and apostasy," and goes on to conclude: "Paul's use of the Israelites to warn the Corinthians about 'standing' and 'falling' suggests that he has this polarity in mind: perseverance [in faith] leading to eternal salvation, or idolatry resulting in eschatological [i.e., future and final] condemnation. Paul holds that eating food known to have been offered to idols as nothing less than "idolatry," and he states emphatically that "no-one who makes a practice of committing idolatry will inherit God's kingdom (1 Cor. 6:9; Gal. 5:20–21; Eph. 5:5)." Therefore, if a Christian persists in such idolatrous behavior they will eventually "fall" or commit apostasy (i.e., become an unbelieving idolater) and be prevented "from entering the kingdom of God,", forfeiting eternal "salvation" with God for "eternal destruction" or "damnation" from God. "Given the close connection between 9:27 and this passage [10:12], one might very well find in this entire section (9:24–10:14) one of the best N.T. passages warning about apostasy." 
 1 Corinthians 15:1–2 – Now I would remind you, brothers, of the gospel I preached to you, which you received, in which you stand, and by which you are being saved, if you hold fast to the word I preached to you—unless you believed in vain. (ESV)
The Corinthians are being saved by means of the gospel and can confidently expect final salvation if in fact … they go on holding fast to such good news as Paul announced to them. … Paul is confident that they are holding fast to the gospel … even so, he feels it necessary to attach an exception clause. They are holding fast—except for the possibility that if they are not they placed their [original] faith (in Christ) in vain. … There is really no reason to doubt that ... the reference to believing in vain reflects the real possibility of apostasy from faith. Apparently Paul regards their doubts about the resurrection of believers seriously enough that his usual confidence in his converts must be qualified at least this much.
 2 Corinthians 11:1–5, 13–15 – I wish that you would be patient with me in a little foolishness, but indeed you are being patient with me! For I am jealous for you with godly jealousy, because I promised you in marriage to one husband, to present you as a pure virgin to Christ. But I am afraid that just as the serpent deceived Eve by his treachery, your minds may be led astray from a sincere and pure devotion to Christ. For if someone comes and proclaims another Jesus different from the one we proclaimed, or if you receive a different spirit than the one you received, or a different gospel than the one you accepted, you put up with it well enough! 5 For I consider myself not at all inferior to those "super-apostles." ... For such people are false apostles, deceitful workers, disguising themselves as apostles of Christ. And no wonder, for even Satan disguises himself as an angel of light. Therefore, it is not surprising his servants also disguise themselves as servants of righteousness, whose end will correspond to their actions. (NET)
The Christians in Corinth are "being seduced and defiled by double agents of Satan (11:2–3)" proclaiming a "false gospel." These false teachers "have snaked their way into the Corinthians' affection and captured their minds" by preaching "a different Jesus, Spirit, and gospel—that can only lead Christians away from Christ" and into "spiritual apostasy." These "false apostles" disguise themselves as servants of God but they are really servants of Satan. "Their … 'end,' in the sense of 'destiny,' or 'fate,' will correspond to what they have done, specifically in introducing alien [i.e., false] teaching (11:4) and seducing the congregation (11:3, 20). ... They have done Satan's work, to Satan's fate they will go. ... (v. 15; cf. Matt 25:41, 46)." Therefore, "'To follow them is to risk damnation.' Such language may sound harsh, but Paul judges the situation to be perilous, calling for sharp warnings to jar the Corinthians awake."
 Galatians 1:6–9 – I am astonished that you are so quickly deserting the one who called you to live in the grace of Christ and are turning to a different gospel—which is really no gospel at all. Evidently some people are throwing you into confusion and are trying to pervert the gospel of Christ. But even if we or an angel from heaven should preach a gospel other than the one we preached to you, let them be under God's curse! As we have already said, so now I say again: If anybody is preaching to you a gospel other than what you accepted, let them be under God's curse! (NIV)
Paul writes to the churches in Galatia who have a large number of uncircumcised Gentiles already standing in a saving relationship with Christ, but are repeatedly warned by him that they are in danger of existing out of this relationship. Simply put, "the Galatians are in danger of apostasy" (i.e., becoming unbelievers). Rival teachers, whom Paul refers to "as 'agitators' or 'troublemakers' (1:7; 5:10b, 12)," have infiltrated the churches and are "leading astray Gentile believers" by "preaching a false gospel of circumcision (1:7; 4:17; 5:7; 6:12)." "The Galatians Christians . . . appear to be giving them a careful and attentive hearing, even standing on the verge of being persuaded by them (1:6; 5:1)." These rival teachers are "persuading gentile converts to receive circumcision . . . (explicitly in 5:2; 6:12-13; indirectly in 5:11-12), probably as a means of securing their place in the family of Abraham, the line of promise (3:6-29), and as a means of combating the power of the flesh (indirectly, 5:13–6:10) and thus experiencing freedom from its power over them so that they can make progress in their new life of godliness (3:3)." These false teachers likely pushed other Torah-prescribed observances (see 4:10), but it was getting the Galatians to take "the final plunge of circumcision" which aligned oneself with the Torah commandments as "the surest path to aligning oneself with God's standards and thus being 'justified' before God ('being deemed to be righteous' or 'brought into line with God's righteous demands by means of the law,' 5:4)." Paul views such teaching as a "different gospel" (1:6)—a perverting of the gospel of Christ (1:7) that he originally preached to them. "He stands amazed at how quickly the Galatians are deserting God to follow a false gospel." This desertion "was not just an intellectual one. Rather, it was a desertion of God as made known in Christ; it was abandoning of their personal relationship with God." The verb for "deserting" (metatithēmi) is in the present tense and "indicates clearly that when the apostle wrote [this letter] the apostasy of the Galatians was as yet only in process." The Gentile believers "were in danger of apostasy" or "a reverse conversion, although they had not yet 'become apostate.' But Paul considered this a real possibility (see 5:4)." Paul passionately declares that if anyone (including himself) was to preach to others this different gospel, "let them be under God's curse!" (v. 8, 9, NIV). Scot McKnight states: "This word ['curse' anathema] is used in the Old Testament for something consecrated to God for his destruction (cf. Deut. 7:26; Josh. 6:17-18). Paul is not talking here about church discipline; his language is far too strong for that. He is invoking God's final damnation and wrath on people who distort the gospel of grace in Christ." Lyons states that "this conditional curse" would carry the meaning: "may he be condemned to hell!" (GNT [cf. NET]). This shocking wish was occasioned by the seriousness of the Agitators' crime. They had perverted the gospel, preached a substitute nongospel, confused his converts, and led them to consider turning away from Christ .... He put those terrifying the Galatians on notice: Beware of divine judgment. And he warned the Galatians that surrender to the Agitators meant placing "themselves 'under the curse'" (Betz 1979, 250). If the Christians in Galatia go on to fully embrace the false gospel of these false teachers they will "fall into apostasy [i.e., become unbelievers] and stop being a Christian." As unbelievers, the false teachers and their followers can expect to receive "eternal punishment at the last judgment."
 Galatians 4:9–11 – But now that you have come to know God (or rather to be known by God), how can you turn back again to the weak and worthless basic forces? Do you want to be enslaved to them all over again? You are observing religious days and months and seasons and years. I fear for you that my work for you may have been in vain. (NET)
"Paul warns the Galatians" that if they "turn back" again to the weak and elemental spirits "they are on the verge of deconverting." "The looming threat of his convert's apostasy (4:8-10; 5:2-4) is now expressed in distress (4:11) .... This is not the only place where Paul warns his converts that if they pursue the wrong path their faith and his work will have been in vain (1 Cor. 15:2, 10, 14; 2 Cor. 6:1; cf. Phil. 2:16) or the only place where he fears the possibility (1 Thess. 3:5)."
 Galatians 5:1–6 – It was for freedom that Christ set us free; therefore keep standing firm and do not be subject again to a yoke of slavery. Behold I, Paul, say to you that if you receive circumcision, Christ will be of no benefit to you. And I testify again to every man who receives circumcision, that he is under obligation to keep the whole Law. You have been severed from Christ, you who are seeking to be justified by law; you have fallen from grace. For we through the Spirit, by faith, are waiting for the hope of righteousness. For in Christ Jesus neither circumcision nor uncircumcision means anything, but faith working through love. (NASB)
Paul warns Gentile Christians that if they follow the demands of the false teachers in seeking to be justified by the law through circumcision then Christ will be of no saving benefit to them (v. 2). Furthermore, they will become "severed from Christ" and will have "fallen from grace" (v. 4). "No doubt the rival teachers had assured them that keeping the law was not abandoning their faith in Christ; it was the way to "attain your goal" (3:3)—perfection—in Christian life." But
For Paul, Christ is everything or nothing. Either God has inaugurated the new, eschatological age of the Spirit through Christ, or not. Either justification, or life in the Spirit, is received by faith, or not. Either cruciform faith expressing itself through cruciform love is the essence of covenantal existence, or not. Either this is all of grace, or not. Whereas for the circumcisers Christ is necessary but not sufficient, for Paul Christ is either sufficient or else not necessary.... Circumcision is a gate into a way of life—obedience to the entire Law (5:3)—that has had its day but has ended with the coming of the Messiah and his Spirit (3:24). Now anyone—a Gentile or Jew—who is in Christ, by faith, shares in the hope of future righteousness (5:5) and expresses that faith, as Christ did (2:20), in love (5:6). Circumcision counts for nothing because ‘having’ it (or not) neither enables or prevents entry into the realm of Christ and the Spirit. Seeking it, however, betrays a lack of confidence in the power of grace and faith, the sufficiency of Christ and the Spirit.
Therefore, submitting to circumcision would indicate "a cessation of faith in Christ," "an act of repudiation of God's grace manifested in Christ." The circumcised end up "returning to their former state of slavery, (4:9; 5:1)," having severed their saving union with Christ, and fallen from grace. Such persons necessarily "cease to be Christians"  and will not receive "a favorable verdict at the final judgment (5:5)." "Paul could hardly have made any clearer that a person who chooses to submit to the Law," (specifically, circumcision as commanded in the Law), and "who seeks final justification" before God "by means of the Law, has in effect committed apostasy, has fallen from grace, has even severed themselves from relationship with Christ." "The danger of apostasy, falling away from grace, must have been very real, or Paul would not have used such strong language." "Paul certainly did not teach the popular doctrine today of 'once saved, always saved.'"
 Galatians 5:16,19–21 – But I say, walk by the Spirit, and you will not gratify the desires of the flesh.... Now the works of the flesh are evident: sexual immorality, impurity, sensuality, idolatry, sorcery, enmity, strife, jealousy, fits of anger, rivalries, dissensions, divisions, envy, drunkenness, orgies, and things like these. I warn you, as I warned you before, that those who do such things will not inherit the kingdom of God. (ESV)
Paul calls Christians in Galatians chapters 5-6 to be "living under the guidance of the Spirit and following the law of love." Paul's opponents, who insist that Gentiles believers must keep the works of the Law (specifically, circumcision), are "condemning uncircumcised Christians," and using "the Law . . . to exclude faithful Gentiles from inheriting God's promises (1:6; 4:17; 5:10)." "The works of the Law, then, when imposed on the Gentile Christ-followers," wind up causing "divisions" among those in the Christian community. "It is not by coincidence that Paul includes vices of division in his list of 'works of the flesh' (5:19-21). For Paul the 'works of the flesh' are deeds associated with" unbelievers (i.e., "the pre-converted status of individuals void of God's Spirit and subject to the evil era"). "To indulge in these works is to commit vices and live in a manner incompatible with the leading of God's Spirit (5:16-18, 22-25)." The "threat of apostasy" "is a real danger" in Paul’s "warning in 5:21b," which is directed specifically "to the believers" in Galatia. Paul's "emphasis here, as in 1 Cor 6:9-11 and Eph 5:5, is to warn believers not to live as unbelievers, those who are destined to experience the wrath of God (Col 3:6)." If believers persist in living according to the flesh like unbelievers, they will eventually become an unbeliever (i.e., commit "apostasy") and "be excluded" from "inheriting God's kingdom." To not inherit (klēronomeō) the kingdom of the God means to fail to "partake of eternal salvation in the Messiah's kingdom" when it becomes fully manifested in the new heaven and new earth described in Revelation 21-22 (cf. Rev. 21:7-8 with Gal. 5:19-21).
 Galatians 6:7–10 – Do not be deceived: God is not mocked, for whatever one sows, that will he also reap. For the one who sows to his own flesh will from the flesh reap corruption, but the one who sows to the Spirit will from the Spirit reap eternal life. And let us not grow weary of doing good, for in due season we will reap, if we do not give up. So then, as we have opportunity, let us do good to everyone, and especially to those who are of the household of faith. (ESV)
Paul issues "a solemn warning based on an agricultural principle: Do not be deceived: God cannot be mocked. A man reaps what he sows (v. 7 [NIV]). When people think and act as if they will not reap what they have sown, or as if they will reap something different from what they have sown, they are deceiving themselves and mocking God." In verse 8, Christians "are faced with a decision, a decision" that will determine their eternal destiny—"sowing to the flesh" or "sowing to the Spirit." Sowing to the flesh would refer to practicing "the works of the flesh" already warned about in 5:19-21. Sowing to the Spirit "is exactly the opposite in every respect and means doing things to or with one another that stem from the Spirit's impulses. And so here we come to 'the fruit of the Spirit' listed in 5:22, 23." Paul spells out the contrasting harvests or destinies: sowing to the Spirit = "eternal life," while sowing to the flesh = "corruption." This warning in Galatians 6:8 is parallel "to the warning about the possibility of not inheriting the Kingdom of God set out in 5.21," for those practicing the works of the flesh. Therefore, this "corruption" or "destruction" (NIV, CSB, NASB2020) can mean nothing less than "eternal destruction" or "eternal death" for sowing to the flesh since it is explicitly contrasted with "eternal life." For any believer overtaken by any sin related to the works of the flesh in 5:19-21, "there is a potential recovery in 6:1." This trespass (paraptōma) "is considered by Paul as a sin or an immoral act (cf. Rom 4:25; 11:11-12; 2 Cor 5:19; Col 2:13; cf. Matt 6:15). Those who operate in the fruit of the Spirit . . . are to restore such individuals, being mindful that they themselves are susceptible to temptations." If a believer were to continue practicing/sowing to the flesh, this would lead to their "apostasy" (i.e. becoming an unbeliever), with the outcome being "eternal destruction and exclusion from God's kingdom (Gal 5:21; 6:7-8)." Hence, Paul holds that believers who are engaged in sowing to the flesh are "headed towards apostasy if not restored." "A real danger exists that believers in Christ may apostatize, falling away from faith, and miss out on eternal life. ... For some Christians the doctrinal slogan is 'once saved, always saved.' Paul would not agree."
 Ephesians 5:1–11 – Therefore be imitators of God, as beloved children. And be walking in love, just as Christ also loved us and handed Himself over for us—an offering and a sacrifice to God for an aroma of fragrance. But let sexual-immorality and all impurity or greed not even be named among you, as is proper for saints—and filthiness and foolish-talk or coarse-joking, which are not fitting, but rather thanksgiving. For you know this—recognizing that every sexually-immoral or impure or greedy person (that is, an idolater) does not have an inheritance in the kingdom of Christ and God. Let no one deceive you with empty words, for because of these things the wrath of God is coming upon the sons of disobedience. Therefore, do not be fellow-partakers with them. For you were formerly darkness, but now you are light in the Lord. Be walking as children of light (for the fruit of the light is in all goodness and righteousness and truth), approving what is pleasing to the Lord. And do not be participating in the unfruitful works of darkness, but rather even be exposing them. (DLNT)
Paul is "warning" believers in Ephesus about "the danger to faith inherent in falling back into the pagan lifestyle." The command, "Let no one deceive you with empty words" warns the Ephesians "against allowing themselves to be led astray by the specious arguments of antinomians" who "pervert the grace of our God into a license for immorality" (Jude 4, NIV), and who promise those engaging in the same sins as the "sons of disobedience" (i.e., unbelievers) as still having an inheritance in the kingdom of Christ and escaping the wrath of God on judgment day. "The reason" believers "should not act like unbelievers is because unbelievers are not going to inherit the kingdom of Christ and God." Paul could not be clearer, Christians must not be fellow-partakers in the sinful way of life of the "sons of disobedience," lest they become one of them and "participate with them in their destiny." Believers "who take a cavalier attitude toward sin are playing games with their eternal destiny."
 Colossians 1:21–23 – Once you were alienated from God and were enemies in your minds because of your evil behavior. But now he has reconciled you by Christ's physical body through death to present you holy in his sight, without blemish and free from accusation—if you continue in your faith, established and firm, and do not move from the hope held out in the gospel. (NIV)
In the first half of verse 23 Paul breaks with tradition to address his readers in a more intimate way. His exhortation to them expresses a condition of their reconciliation, which includes both a positive and a negative element. This exhortation has caused problems for those who think of Paul's idea of salvation in terms of God's unconditional grace. However, Paul's understanding of God's salvation is profoundly Jewish and therefore covenantal. The promise of the community's final justification is part of a covenant between God and the "true" Israel. Even the idea of God's faithfulness to a promise made is modified by the ideals of a covenantal relationship: God's fulfillment is conditioned upon a particular response. According to Paul's gospel, getting into the faith community, which has covenanted with God for salvation, requires the believer's confidence in the redemptive merit of Christ's death (as defined in vv. 21–22). And staying in that community requires the believer to keep the faith. Paul does not teach a "once saved, always saved" kind of religion; nor does he understand faith as a "once for all" decision for Christ. In fact, apostasy (loss of faith) imperils one's relationship with God and with the community that has covenanted with God for salvation. So he writes that the community's eschatological fitness holds if you continue in your faith... The negative ingredient of the passage envisions the very real possibility that the community may indeed [move] from the hope held out in the gospel, risking God's negative verdict at Christ's parousia.
 1 Thessalonians 3:1–5 – So when we could stand it no longer, we thought it best to be left by ourselves in Athens. We sent Timothy, who is our brother and God's fellow worker in spreading the gospel of Christ, to strengthen and encourage you in your faith, so that no one would be unsettled by these trials. You know quite well that we were destined for them. In fact, when we were with you, we kept telling you that we would be persecuted. And it turned out that way, as you well know. For this reason, when I could stand it no longer, I sent to find out about your faith. I was afraid that in some way the tempter might have tempted you and our efforts might have been useless. (NIV, 1984)
The possibility of apostasy is expressed in the final part of the verse: I was afraid that in some way the tempter might have tempted you and our efforts might have been useless. ... Paul expresses apprehension, which was rooted in his knowledge of Satanic activity. Although the Thessalonians' contemporaries were driving the persecution forward, the power of the tempter orchestrated this battle for their souls (cf. Eph. 6:11–12). ... The temptation of the tempter was ... to commit the sin of apostasy (Luke 8:12; 1 Pet. 5:8), which is implied in this context by the references to their stability and continuance in the faith (3:3, 6, 8). The issue is not moral lapse but continuance in faith. What was at stake was the salvation of the Thessalonians. Paul knew the machination of Satan (2 Cor. 2:11), the tempter, but he was unsure whether he had met success in Thessalonica (and out efforts might have been useless). The temptation, while inevitable, was resistible. But the possibility of apostasy was clear a clear and present danger.
 1 Timothy 1:18–20 – This charge I commit to you, Timothy, my son, in accordance with the prophetic utterances which pointed to you, that inspired by them you may wage the good warfare, holding faith and a good conscience. By rejecting conscience, certain persons have made shipwreck of their faith, among them Hymenaeus and Alexander, whom I have delivered to Satan that they may learn not to blaspheme. (RSV)
"Central to this charge is the defense and preservation of the true faith, which is currently under attack" from false teachers. Paul depicts Timothy's role "as a warrior in service to his or her king. This is wholly appropriate following a doxology to 'the eternal King' (1:17)." "Timothy is to wage warfare, not by using violence, but by holding on to faith and a good conscience (v. 19)." "Faith involves here the act of trusting in God" "A good conscience is the state where one's own moral self-evaluation says that one has been obedient to God." "The conscience functions as the Christian's moral compass" and "is guided in its everyday life by faith, trust in the living God, to guide and to teach one." Holding on to a good conscience would thus entail being committed to following the Christian faith proclaimed by Christ's apostles as the basis for godly living. "Without a good conscience, Timothy could end up like Hymenaeus (cf. 2 Tim 2:17) and Alexander (cf. 2 Tim 4:14) who had shipwrecked their faith (1:19-20)." Paul, "as a warning, cites two tragic examples of men whose moral laxity has led to their faith being ruined." They have "rejected" (apōtheō) or better "'thrust away from themselves' a good conscience." The verb expresses "a willful and violent act," "a conscious, deliberate rejection . . . not a passive, careless slipping away from faith." By willfully thrusting away a good conscience they have made "shipwreck of their faith." "The metaphoric use of the word [shipwreck] conveys a complete loss of the ship," a "total disaster," and serves as a fitting "metaphor for apostasy" since these men have "lost their faith altogether." Thus, Hymenaeus and Alexander "were once true believers" who "had personal faith comparable to Timothy's (1:18-19a), but that faith was destroyed,", and thus they became "apostates" (i.e., unbelievers).
 1 Timothy 4:1-5 – Now the Spirit clearly says that in the last times some of the faith will apostatize by being devoted to deceitful spirits and teachings of demons, by the hypocrisy of liars whose own consciences have been seared, forbidding to marry, demanding abstinence from foods that God created to be received with thanksgiving by those who are faithful and know the truth, since all of God's creation is good, and nothing is unclean if it is received with thanksgiving; for it is sanctified through [the] word of God and prayer. (Mounce Reverse-Interlinear New Testament)
The Spirit has given a clear "warning"  about "the sober" reality "of apostasy" that will take place within the church. "The ultimate cause of this apostasy is that people pay attention to deceitful spirits and teachings of demons.” The verb aphistēmi means to "fall away, apostatize," in three theologically significant passages in the New Testament (Lk. 8:13; 1 Tim. 4:1; Heb. 3:12), and "often conveys apostasy" in the Old Testament and other literature. In each of these NT references we find aphistēmi conveying "the serious situation of becoming separated from the living God after a previous turning towards him, by falling away from the faith. It is a movement of unbelief and sin." Paul says in verse 1, "some of the faith will fall away or apostatize." William Mounce's translation brings this out and is more accurate than other renderings. When Mounce examined the NT occurrences of aphistēmi, he says "in the vast majority of cases if there is a recipient of the verb's action, it will most likely be indicated by a preposition and will immediately follow the verb."
Hence, in 1 Tim 4:1, which has no preposition following [aphistēmi, fall away], "the faith" would seem to modify the indefinite pronoun "some" rather [than] the verb "fall away." If so, then the "some" who will fall away are identified as faithful church members. These ones who apostatize are not fake believers but real Christians. The nature of their apostasy involves devoting themselves to deceitful spirits and demonic teachings. These teachings are no doubt promulgated by the false teachers (4:2-5). Satanic spiritual forces are viewed as being the inspiration of their false teachings, and these powers are mentioned as a way to vilify the teachers (1 Tim 5:15; 2 Tim 2:25-26). Some of the believers will fall away by following the opponents' teachings that have been influenced by anti-god powers (1 Tim 4:1-3). It is affirmed here that more apostasies of those who possessed faith will take place similar to the defections of Hymenaeus and Alexander (1 Tim 1:19; cf. 1:6). In the Pastoral Letters, then, final salvation is futuristic, with the real potential to have one’s faith undermined, making it all the more important for these Christians to take seriously the need to endure through potential deception.
 1 Timothy 4:13, 15-16 – Until I come, give your attention to public reading, exhortation, and teaching. . . . Practice these things; be committed to them, so that your progress may be evident to all. Pay close attention to your life and your teaching; persevere in these things, for by doing this you will save both yourself and your hearers. (HCSB)
In Paul's final exhortation to Timothy in v. 16, he gives "the reason why" he "is so persistent and concerned, because what is at stake is salvation for Timothy and his hearers." Traditional Calvinist George Knight observes that some commentators take save (sōzō, v. 16) in the sense of to preserve or be kept safe from the doctrinal error of the false teachers "(Bengel, Gromacki, Vine, Wuest)," but most commentators understand save "soteriologically and eschatologically (Alford, Bernard, Brox Bürki, Calvin, Earle, Ellicott, Fairbairn, Gealy, Guthrie, Hendriksen, Hiebert, Huther, Kelly, Kent, Lenski, Moellering, Robertson, Scott, Simpson, van Oosterzee, and White; also J. Schneider, NIDNTT 3:215; W. Foerster, TDNT 7:995)." Knight goes on to note: "The other occurrences of [sōzō, save] in the PE (1 Tim. 1:15; 2:4, 15; Tit. 3:5; 2 Tim. 1:9; 4:18) are clearly soteriological [i.e., salvation] in orientation. It is true that [didaskalia, teaching] does deliver from error and bring to truth, but that seems to be included in the ultimate goal expressed in [sōzō, save] (cf. 2:4; so also Oosterzee). The salvation of the hearers is elsewhere depicted by Paul as the central goal of the ministry (cf. especially 1 Cor. 15:1, 2; 9:22; 2 Ti. 2:10; 4:5), and it is that hope in the living God who is the Savior of all believers that Paul has presented as the centerpiece of encouragement for Timothy in this section." Gordon Fee would agree, and thus writes: "Salvation involves perseverance; and Timothy's task in Ephesus is to model and teach the gospel in such a fashion that it will lead the church to perseverance in faith and love and hence to final . . . salvation." Therefore, "Ultimate salvation is not automatic, even for Timothy. He must persevere in the faith to be saved eternally, and to be the instrument to save others."
 2 Timothy 2:10–13 – For this reason, I am enduring all things for the sake of the chosen ones, in order that they also may obtain salvation in Christ Jesus with eternal glory. The saying is trustworthy— for if we died-with Him, we will also live-with Him; if we are enduring, we will also reign-with Him; if we shall deny Him, that One also will deny us; if we are faithless, that One remains faithful, for He cannot deny Himself. (DLNT)
Paul suggests in 2 Timothy 2:10, that if he faithfully endures suffering and hardship to the end of life, this will provide "a good witness to others and is done for the sake of the chosen ones," in order that they, "will persevere and go on to receive eschatological [i.e., future and final] salvation." "The potential for apostasy" among believers in Ephesus "is clearly evident in the hymn found in 2 Tim 2:11–13." This trustworthy saying has four "if" clauses that describe a believer's action that are followed by "then" clauses that describe Christ's action taken in response. The "we" throughout this hymn applies first to Paul and Timothy, and then "equally to all believers." The hymn begins with: "if we died with him (Christ), we will also live with him (2:11b)." This line "portrays the entire scope of Christian existence, from conversion to glorification, in terms of 'dying and rising' with Christ." The next clause says "enduring" leads to "reigning with" Christ. The word enduring (hupomenō) means "to persevere: absolutely and emphatically, under misfortunes and trial to hold fast to one's faith in Christ." The present tense verb conveys the meaning "keep on enduring" or "persevering." Thus, a persevering faith "is to be a normal way of life" for Timothy and other Christ-followers. Paul and Timothy "must endure in spite of every adversity, including suffering and/or imprisonment, so that others 'may also obtain the salvation that is in Christ Jesus with eternal glory.'" Believers who faithfully keep on enduring will "reign together with" (symbasileuō) Christ. This means that they will "share in the 'kingdom of God' (basileia tou theou), the traditional symbol of God's eschatological [i.e., future and final] reign (see 4:1, 18), the focus of Jesus' own preaching of the good news (see Mark 1:15)." "The causal connection between perseverance in the present age of suffering and the future attainment of salvation is expressly stated in 2 Tm. 2:12." The third clause contains a definite "warning against apostasy." "If we deny Him, He will also deny us" certainly recalls "Jesus' warning that if his followers deny him publicly before outsiders he will deny them before his Father at the eschatological [i.e., future and final] judgment (cf. Matt 10:33; Mark 8:38; Luke 9:36). This type of denial (ἀρνέομαι [arneomai]) refers to apostasy resulting from persecution, and this is almost certainly what it means here in 2 Tim 2:12." To deny Jesus is the opposite of enduring/persevering (in faith) and "means the surrender of faith, 'to apostatize.'" Such denial reverses conversion so that Christ disowns the person who denies him, and as with the Synoptic sayings this leads to eternal judgment. This warning is definitely directed toward Timothy, "Paul and all believers." "If it is not possible to disown faith in Christ, there is no need for these words. The possibility of Timothy and others disowning the faith is real."

Conditional security in the book of Hebrews
"Hebrews contains what are perhaps the most severe warnings against apostasy in the entire New Testament."
 Hebrews 2:1–4 – We must pay the most careful attention, therefore, to what we have heard, so that we do not drift away. For since the message spoken through angels was binding, and every violation and disobedience received its just punishment, how shall we escape if we ignore so great a salvation? This salvation, which was first announced by the Lord, was confirmed to us by those who heard him. God also testified to it by signs, wonders and various miracles, and by gifts of the Holy Spirit distributed according to his will. (NIV)
The expression "what we have heard" refers to God's revelation in his Son about salvation (cf. 2:3a). Here the danger of drifting away ... [is] a carelessness about the commitment to Christ that it requires. The verb prosecho (lit., "to give heed") means not only "pay attention" with the mind to what one hears, but also "to act upon what one perceives" (Morris, 1981, 21). This verb is analogous to katecho in 3:6, 14; 10:23, where the readers are admonished to "hold fast to their confession of faith, without which the goal of salvation cannot be reached" (Lane, 1991, 37). The Greek word translated "drift away" (pararreo) has nautical overtones, as when a ship drifts past a harbor to shipwreck. 

"The danger of drifting away is a potential one for his [the author's] audience, which, if not corrected, may lead to their being spiritually lost at sea or shipwrecked." The danger of apostasy is also understood as ignoring the "great salvation" spoken through the Son. The implied answer to "'How shall we escape if we ignore such a great salvation?'—is obvious: No escape is possible. In Hebrews "salvation" (soteria) … is fulfilled by Jesus in the present time (2:3, 10; 5:9), and will be consummated in his future coming (cf. 1:14; 6:9; 9:28; see TDNT, 7:989–1012). ... The emphasis here and elsewhere in Hebrews is on the inescapable, terrible, and eternal consequences for apostasy (cf. 6:4–6; 10:26–31)." "Not escaping looks ahead to punishment in hellfire (6:8; 10:26-31; 12:29)" for believers who "apostatize" by drifting away from Christ (2:1) and ignoring God's glorious salvation in his Son (2:3a). "What Christian apostates stand to lose, then, is eternal salvation." "The author identifies his readers as fellow believers by using the pronoun 'we' in 2:1, 3a and 'us' in 2:3. ... By using ... 'we,' our author ... includes himself and all other believers in the same warning (cf. 3:6, 14; 10:26–27; 12:25)," and implies, "'I, too, am susceptible to these dangers of apostasy.'"
 Hebrews 3:7–19 – So, as the Holy Spirit says: "Today, if you hear his voice, do not harden your hearts as you did in the rebellion, during the time of testing in the desert, where your fathers tested and tried me and for forty years saw what I did. That is why I was angry with that generation, and I said, 'Their hearts are always going astray, and they have not known my ways.' So I declared on oath in my anger, 'They shall never enter my rest.'" See to it, brothers, that none of you has a sinful, unbelieving heart that turns away ["falls away," NASB]  from the living God. But encourage ["exhort," ESV] one another daily, as long as it is called Today, so that none of you may be hardened by sin's deceitfulness. We have come to share in Christ if we hold firmly till the end the confidence we had at first. As has just been said: "Today, if you hear his voice, do not harden your hearts as you did in the rebellion." Who were they who heard and rebelled? Were they not all those Moses led out of Egypt? And with whom was he angry for forty years? Was it not with those who sinned, whose bodies fell in the desert? And to whom did God swear that they would never enter his rest if not to those who disobeyed? So we see that they were not able to enter, because of their unbelief. (Heb. 3:7-19, NIV 1984)
Hebrews views the possibility of remaining steadfast in faith or abandoning faith as a real choice facing the readers; the author illustrates the consequences of the latter by referring to the destruction of the rebellious Hebrews in the desert after their glorious deliverance from Egypt (3:7–19). The final statement in 3:6 ["And we are God's house, if indeed we hold firmly to our confidence and the hope in which we glory"] serves as a transition to the solemn warning and exhortation in 3:7–19. As a comparison was drawn between Moses and Jesus in 3:1–6, so now a parallel is drawn between (1) the response of unbelief and disobedience by the Hebrews who were redeemed out of Egypt under Moses' leadership (3:7–11), and (2) the possibility of the same response by the Hebrews who were redeemed by Christ under the new covenant provisions of salvation (3:12–19). Moses had been faithful to the end (3:2, 5), but most of those who left Egypt with him were unfaithful. They all shared by faith in the first great Passover deliverance but afterward because of unbelief hardened their hearts against God and perished in the desert (cf. Num. 13:26–14:38). Likewise, Christ, who is far superior to Moses, is also faithful (Heb. 3:2, 6), but the author of Hebrews was deeply concerned that the community of Hebrew Christians he is addressing, who had experienced the deliverance of the cross, were now in danger of hardening their hearts and of perishing because of unbelief …. Lane observes: "The warning against unbelief in vv. 12 and 19 provides a literary and theological frame for the admonition to maintain the basic position of faith, which is centrally placed in v. 14" (1991, 83). ... The warning of Hebrews 3:7–19 is that "those who have experienced the redemption of the cross may find themselves in a similar situation" (Hagner, 1983, 43) to the desert generation who perished, if they harden their hearts in unbelief and turn back from Christ to their former way of life. The passage represents a serious exhortation to persevering discipleship and unwavering faith. ... That his readers are genuine Christians is again indicated by the word "brothers" (cf. 3:1). He is concerned that … "none of you has a sinful, unbelieving heart that turns away [apostenai, lit., departs] from the living God" (pers. trans.). Like the Hebrews mentioned in Psalm 95:7–11, God's people under the new covenant "sometimes turn away from God in apostasy. ... This may be provoked by suffering or persecution or by the pressures of temptation, but the root cause is always unbelief" (Peterson, 1994, 1330). … As with the desert generation, apostasy is not so much a decision of the moment as it is the culmination of a process of hardening the heart (3:8, 13, 15) in unbelief (3:12, 19; cf. 4:2), resulting in the end in rebellion against God (3:8, 15, 16), disobedience (3:18; cf. 4:6), and finally turning away from God (3:12; cf. 3:10). An important safeguard against apostasy is a loving, nurturing community of true believers, who "encourage one another daily" in the Lord (3:13). 
 Hebrews 4:1–11 – Therefore, since the promise of entering his rest still stands, let us be careful ["let us fear lest," ESV; cf. NASB, HCSB] that none of you be found to have fallen short of it. For we also have had the gospel preached to us, just as they did; but the message they heard was of no value to them, because those who heard did not combine it with faith. Now we who have believed enter that rest, just as God has said, "So I declared on oath in my anger, 'They shall never enter my rest.'" And yet his work has been finished since the creation of the world. For somewhere he has spoken about the seventh day in these words: "And on the seventh day God rested from all his work." And again in the passage above he says, "They shall never enter my rest." It still remains that some will enter that rest, and those who formerly had the gospel preached to them did not go in, because of their disobedience. Therefore, God again set a certain day, calling it Today, when a long time later he spoke through David, as was said before: "Today, if you hear his voice, do not harden your hearts." For if Joshua had given them rest, God would not have spoken later about another day. There remains, then, a Sabbath-rest for the people of God; for anyone who enters God's rest also rests from his own work, just as God did from his. Let us, therefore, make every effort to enter that rest, so that no one will fall by following their example of disobedience. (NIV 1984)
On the heels of describing the wilderness generations "dire consequences for apostasy" in 3:16-19, the author connects what he had just written to his forthcoming teaching in 4:1-11 with "an in inferential particle (oun, Therefore)." "Therefore—In view of the fearful examples of apostasy in the last chapter. Let us fear" of being found to have fallen short of God's promised rest. This implies "a belief in its practical possibility and an earnest desire to avoid it." "By including himself in 'let us fear,' the author enlists the audience to share his concern that some of them might apostatize and thus not only fail to enter into God's rest but also influence others not to." Both the wilderness generation and the believers the author is addressing "are part of the one people of God called by his word to the same kind of faith and obedience in anticipation of the same 'rest.'" The "wilderness generation’s apostasy" and consequent exclusion from entering into God's promised rest "poses the sternest warning to contemporary believers. On the basis of this continuity the pastor urges his hearers to separate themselves from their predecessors by persevering in faithful obedience." "The wilderness generation came all the way to the border of the Promised Land but 'fell short' of entrance through refusal to trust God. . . . The opposite of falling short is perseverance in the life of faith and obedience until final entrance into God's rest (cf. 11:1-38)." God's people have the opportunity of entering into God's promised rest through a persevering faith, or of being found/judged by God on judgment day to have fallen short of it through unbelief and disobedience. "God's 'rest' is available and its loss a true possibility." Note how complementary warnings bracket verses 1-11. 
Therefore, let us fear, since a promise remains of entering his rest, 
lest any of you should be found to have fallen short. (v. 1)

Let us be diligent, then, to enter into this rest, 
lest anyone fall by the same example of disobedience. (v. 11)
This promised rest (katapausis) which believers are to be diligent to enter requires "diligent faith"  and "is not the same as entering the Promised Land of Canaan. Joshua led them into that land, yet we are told here that Joshua did not lead them in the promised rest. If he had, the author claimed, the door to rest would still not be open (4:8)." Thus, as J. Ramsey Michaels states, entering God's rest "is not an earthly rest . . . but a heavenly rest in the sense of eternal salvation or life with God after death." Many commentators and scholars (Calvinist and Arminian) interpret God's rest in this manner, as do several Greek reference works. Furthermore, many commentators and scholars mention how
"Rest" correlates with other images of salvation described as future ("to come") or transcendent ("heavenly") in Hebrews. There are future realities such as "the world to come" (2:5), powers of the age to come (6:5), good things to come (10:1), and the city to come (13:14). Their transcendent character is expressed in references to the heavenly call (3:1), "heavenly gift" (6:4), heavenly sanctuary (8:5), "heavenly things" (9:23), heavenly homeland (11:16), and "heavenly Jerusalem" (12:22).
The rest may be compared with "the promised eternal inheritance" (9:15; see 6:12; 10:36) or salvation (1:14; see 9:28). It is an entrance into glory (2:10) or into "the inner sanctuary behind the curtain" (6:19), where Jesus has already entered as our forerunner (6:20) and champion (2:9-10; 12:2). The rest fulfilled in the unshakable kingdom (12:28), that "enduring city" (13:14) with solid foundations, whose "architect and builder is God" (11:10). Rest, then, is one of the many images that display the multifaceted character of our eschatological [i.e., future and final] hope. 
God's rest is "the final goal of the Christian pilgrimage" where believers who persevere in faith experience "final entrance into God's presence at Christ's return." Since this heavenly rest can be forfeited through unbelief and disobedience, believers must diligently strive by faith to enter this rest, "lest anyone fall by the same example of disobedience"  displayed by the wilderness generation. This "fall" (piptō) means to "commit apostasy" and corresponds to the use of "fall" (piptō) "in 1 Cor 10:12, another passage that uses the example of the wilderness generation's defection to warn believers." In both passages "the audience is warned against committing apostasy and falling into eschatological [i.e., future and final] ruin." Both "of these verses makes clear that the apostasy threatening the audience follows after the rebellion of Israel in the wilderness. The Christ-followers in Hebrews are identified as God's people in the last days, and they are in danger of rejecting God and failing to enter the promised eschatological rest. . . . They are in danger of abandoning God and the final salvation that comes at the end of their journey. Their potential rejection of God would happen through disobedience and unbelief.
 Hebrews 5:8-9 - "[Jesus] learned obedience from [the things] which he suffered. And having been made perfect, he became to all the ones obeying him [the] source of eternal salvation" (Heb 5:8-9).
"This wonderful accomplishment of eternal salvation applies . . . literally 'to all those who keep on obeying him' (Greek present participle)." This "eternal salvation" (aiōnios sōtēria) refers to "Messianic and spiritual salvation" and includes "deliverance from punishment and misery as the consequence of sin, and admission to eternal life and happiness in the kingdom of Christ the Savior." "The implication is clear. Those who do not continue to obey him . . . forfeit their eternal salvation."
 Hebrews 6:4–8 – For it is impossible, in the case of those who have once been enlightened, who have tasted the heavenly gift, and have shared in the Holy Spirit, and have tasted the goodness of the word of God and the powers of the age to come, and then have fallen away, to restore them again to repentance, since they are crucifying once again the Son of God to their own harm and holding him up to contempt. For land that has drunk the rain that often falls on it, and produces a crop useful to those for whose sake it is cultivated, receives a blessing from God. But if it bears thorns and thistles, it is worthless and near to being cursed, and its end is to be burned. (ESV)
 Hebrews 10:26–31 – For if we go on sinning deliberately after receiving the knowledge of the truth, there no longer remains a sacrifice for sins, but a fearful expectation of judgment, and a fury of fire that will consume the adversaries. Anyone who has set aside the law of Moses dies without mercy on the evidence of two or three witnesses. How much worse punishment, do you think, will be deserved by the one who has spurned the Son of God, and has profaned the blood of the covenant by which he was sanctified, and has outraged the Spirit of grace? For we know the One who has said, Vengeance belongs to Me, I will repay, and again, The Lord will judge His people. It is a terrifying thing to fall into the hands of the living God! (ESV)
 Hebrews 10:37–39 – For in just a little while: "The one who is coming will come and will not delay. And my righteous one will live by faith, but if he shrinks back, my soul takes no pleasure in him." Now we are not part of those who shrink back, resulting in destruction, but of those who have faith, resulting in the soul's salvation. (EHV)
The coming one is Christ and the phrase "my righteous one" is "the person of faith." "This supports the author's presupposition that his readers are all believers (and thus 'righteous'), but that some of them are in danger of shrinking back from the life of faith." The person of faith is confronted with "two contrasting courses of action . . . living by faith or shrinking back"  "by unfaith." Shrinking back involves "timidity or cowardice" and refers to "not keeping faith" and leads to "apostasy." These contrasting actions lead to corresponding destinies: "living by faith" results in "the soul's salvation," while shrinking back in unbelief leads to "destruction." This destruction (apōleia) is "eternal destruction" since it is the opposite of "the soul's salvation." The writer in this passage is trying to "head off apostasy" by warning believers "about the dire consequences of apostasy." 
 Hebrews 12:1–13 – Therefore, since we are surrounded by such a great cloud of witnesses, we must get rid of every weight and the sin that clings so closely, and run with endurance the race set out for us, keeping our eyes fixed on Jesus, the pioneer and perfecter of our faith. For the joy set out for him he endured the cross, disregarding its shame, and has taken his seat at the right hand of the throne of God. Think of him who endured such opposition against himself by sinners, so that you may not grow weary in your souls and give up. You have not yet resisted to the point of bloodshed in your struggle against sin. And have you forgotten the exhortation addressed to you as sons? “My son, do not scorn the Lord’s discipline or give up when he corrects you. “For the Lord disciplines the one he loves and chastises every son he accepts.” Endure your suffering as discipline; God is treating you as sons. For what son is there that a father does not discipline? But if you do not experience discipline, something all sons have shared in, then you are illegitimate and are not sons. Besides, we have experienced discipline from our earthly fathers and we respected them; shall we not submit ourselves all the more to the Father of spirits and receive life? For they disciplined us for a little while as seemed good to them, but he does so for our benefit, that we may share his holiness. Now all discipline seems painful at the time, not joyful. But later it produces the fruit of peace and righteousness for those trained by it. Therefore, strengthen your listless hands and your weak knees, and make straight paths for your feet, so that what is lame may not be put out of joint but be healed. (NET)
"Since the believers have so many previous examples of faith who stand as a cluster of spectators or "cloud of witnesses," they are encouraged to run their metaphoric footrace of life with endurance (Heb 12:1; cf. ch. 11; 1 Cor 9:24–27)." The footrace imagery is just one more example of the people of God on the move towards the goal of final salvation with God. With this race metaphor, the author is concerned that all the participants "run until reaching the finish line. Once that has been achieved, the location is transformed from a stadium to the heavenly Jerusalem (12:22). Hence, the footrace concerns the participants' endurance, and apostasy would seem to be the outcome for those who do not finish the race. The runners are to mimic the attitude of the faithful champions who are now watching them in the stadium as the runners participate in the contest." Running the race appropriately involves laying "aside every impediment and easily obstructing sin, similar to a runner who loses excess body weight and sets aside heavy clothes or anything else that would hinder the athlete's speed." The sin which clings so closely is left unspecified. Even though some commentators hold that "it is the sin of apostasy (cf. Heb 3:13; 10:26)," this is unlikely the case here. "The closest prior mention of sin is in 11:25, which speaks of Moses choosing mistreatment with God's people over the temporary pleasures of sin." Since this sin is connected with pleasure (apolausis) in a negative sense, this "often refers to enticements related to forbidden foods and sensual vices, and this comes close to the meaning of sin in 12:16. The imagery of laying aside excess impediments in 12:1 is something normally done before the race starts, which tend to make the "sin" relevant to pre-conversion impediments that would hinder the participants during their new course of life if they are not discarded. The sin in 12:1 therefore refers to pre-converted sins or sin in general (cf. 9:26). Sin can "ensnare easily any runner (cf. 12:1, 14-16)," and therefore must be discarded. As runners believers are to keep their eyes focused on Jesus who is "seated in the place of honor." Jesus has completed the race by enduring hostility from sinners and "great suffering to the shedding of blood, something the believers have not yet experienced (12:2–4). Jesus is thus the ultimate exemplar of faithfulness as well as the object of faith for the runners." By fixing their eyes on Jesus and what he did for them on the cross, believers will be inspired "not to grow fatigued and "give up" on the race." As good athletes believers are to endure the Lord's discipline (paideia)—the stringent training that enables running a good race (12:5–11). This paideia is "a non-punitive discipline in Heb 12. The discipline and suffering the believer's experience, in other words, are not the result of divine punishment. Rather, the training and suffering fosters virtuous living with the special qualities of holiness and righteousness (12:10–11)." "Submission to divine training requires confident, enduring faith." Christ's kingdom." The racing "imagery turns to a fatigued or crippled runner who needs reviving so as to continue advancing: 'Therefore strengthen your drooping hands and your feeble knees and make straight paths for your feet so that what is crippled may not be dislocated [ektrepō] but rather be healed' (Heb 12:12–13/Prov 4:26)." A dislocated joint would prevent the runner from finishing the race. "Thus committing apostasy is implied as a negative outcome of what might happen if the runner is not healed and strengthened once again. The exhortation delivered by the author here is intended to strengthen and renew his readers who have become "spiritually fatigued and about to give up the metaphoric race" that leads to the eternal life in the presence of God in his heavenly kingdom.
 Hebrews 12:14–17 – Make every effort to live in peace with everyone and to be holy; without holiness no one will see the Lord. See to it that no one falls short of the grace of God and that no bitter root grows up to cause trouble and defile many. See that no one is sexually immoral, or is godless like Esau, who for a single meal sold his inheritance rights as the oldest son. Afterward, as you know, when he wanted to inherit this blessing, he was rejected. Even though he sought the blessing with tears, he could not change what he had done. (NIV)
As holiness belongs to the essence of God and is his highest glory, so it is to characterize God's people. We were chosen in Christ to be holy (Eph. 1:4), and God disciplines us as his children so "that we may share in his holiness" (12:10). ... Lane observes that "in Hebrews 'pure' and 'holy' are interchangeable terms because those who have been made holy are those for whom Christ has made purification. ... Christians have within their reach the holiness that is indispensable for seeing God" (1991, 451). Holiness "is not an optional extra in the Christian life but something which belongs to its essence. It is the pure in heart, and none but they, who shall see God Matt. 5:8). Here [Heb. 12:14], as in v. 10, practical holiness of life is meant" (Bruce, 1990, 348). Thus 12:14 begins by exhorting believers to earnestly pursue peace and holiness as a way of life. "Make every effort" (dioko) conveys diligence in the pursuit of peace and holiness. ... Peace is viewed as an objective reality tied to Christ and his redemptive death on the cross, which makes possible harmony and solidarity in Christian community (cf. Col. 1:20). Similarly, "holiness" is essential to Christian community (cf. 12:15). Sin divides and defiles the body of Christ, just as cancer does a human body. To pursue holiness suggests a process of sanctification in which our life and manner of living are set apart for God as holy and God-honoring. Verse 14 concludes that "without holiness no one will see the Lord." To "see" the Lord and "know" him intimately are closely related. To see the Lord "is the highest and most glorious blessing mortals can enjoy, but the beatific vision is reserved for those who are holy in heart and life" (Bruce, 1990, 349). Things that are unholy effectively block seeing and knowing God and in the end keep the person from inheriting the kingdom of God (cf. 1 Cor. 6:9–10). Believers must be vigilantly watchful over the spiritual well-being of each member of the church. The verb translated "see to it" (episkopeo; 12:15a) conveys the idea of spiritual oversight and is related to the function of "overseers" or elders. This verb is a present active participle with the force of an imperative and carries the sense of "watching continually." Three subordinate clauses of warning follow this verb, each one introduced by the words "that no one" (me tis): Watch continually—"that no one misses the grace of God" (12:15a) "that no bitter root grows up ..." (12:15b) "that no one is sexually immoral or ... godless" (12:16a). This appeal to spiritual watchfulness is a call to the church as a whole. The exhortation "see to it that no one misses the grace of God" (12:15a) is a key statement. Remaining steadfast in faith (10:19–11:40), enduring discipline as children (12:1–13), and pursuing peace and holiness (12:14) are all related to the grace of God, as is everything involving our salvation. If entrance into the Christian life is by the grace of God, even so the continuance and completion of it is by the grace of God. The dreadful possibility of missing God's grace is not because his grace is inaccessible, but because some may choose not to avail themselves of it. For this reason it is possible for a person (though once a believer) not to reach the goal that is attainable only by his grace operating through faith (cf. 3:12; Bruce, 1990, 349). Marshall makes several observations concerning this warning passage (1969, 149–51). (1) It is possible for a believer to draw back from the grace of God (12:15a; cf. 2 Cor. 6:1; Gal. 5:4). The context of the warning here, as elsewhere in Hebrews (e.g., Heb. 2:1–4; 6:4–8; 10:26–31), indicates that a true believer is meant. (2) Where the grace of God is missed, bitterness will take root and potentially defile other members in the church (12:15b). The deadly sins of unbelief and a poisonous root of bitterness function like a fatally contagious disease that can "defile many" in the community. (3) No one should be "sexually immoral [pornos; lit., fornicator] or ... godless like Esau." Esau was a sensual man rather than a spiritual man—entirely earthly-minded rather than heavenly-minded—who traded away "his inheritance rights as the oldest son" (12:16b) for the momentary gratification of his physical senses. He represents those who would make the unthinkable exchange of long-range spiritual inheritance (i.e., things hoped for but not yet seen, 11:1) for present tangible and visible benefits, momentary though they be. Afterwards, when Esau realized the foolishness of his choice, he wanted to inherit his blessing but could not since "he was rejected" by God (12:17a). Attridge notes that the comment on Esau "conveys the sharpest warning" of this passage (1989, 369). Though some have understood verse 17b to mean that Esau could not change Isaac's mind, the more likely sense is that of rejection by God—that is, repentance was not granted by God. "God did not give Esau the opportunity of changing his mind and gaining what he had forfeited. The author intends his readers to apply this story to themselves and their salvation. Just as Esau was rejected by God, so can they be rejected if they spurn their spiritual birthright" (Marshall, 1969, 150). Bruce concurs that this example of Esau "is a reinforcement of the warning given at an earlier stage in the argument, that after apostasy no second repentance is possible" (1990, 352). Esau's "tears" represent regret for having lost his birthright, not repentance for having despised and shown contempt for God's gift of a birthright and for the covenant by which it was secured. This is all immediately applicable to the readers of this book, for Esau represents "apostate persons who are ready to turn their backs on God and the divine promises, in reckless disregard of the blessings secured by the sacrificial death of Jesus" (Lane, 1991, 455). In other words, a person may miss the grace of God and the spiritual inheritance of eternal life that he or she might have received. In such cases "God may not permit ... an opportunity of repentance. Not all sinners go this far; but an apostate may well find that he has stretched the mercy of God to its limit, so that he cannot return" (Marshall, 1969, 150–51).
 Hebrews 12:18–29 – You haven’t come, after all, to something that can be touched – a blazing fire, darkness, gloom and whirlwind, the sound of a trumpet and a voice speaking words which the hearers begged not to have to listen to any more. (They couldn’t bear the command that ‘if even a beast touches the mountain, it must be stoned’.) The sight was so terrifying that even Moses said, ‘I’m trembling with fear.’ No: you have come to Mount Zion – to the city of the living God, the heavenly Jerusalem. You have come to where thousands and thousands of angels are gathered for a festival; to the assembly of the firstborn, whose names are written in heaven. You have come to God the judge of all, to the spirits of righteous people who have been made perfect, and to Jesus the mediator of the new covenant, and to the sprinkled blood which has better words to say than the blood of Abel. Take care [“Watch out,” LEB] that you don’t refuse the one who is speaking. For if people didn’t escape when they rejected the one who gave them earthly warnings, how much more if we turn away from the one who speaks from heaven! At that point, his voice shook the earth; but now he has issued a promise in the following words: ‘One more time I will shake not only the earth but heaven as well.’ The phrase ‘one more time’ shows that the things that are to be shaken (that is, the created things) will be taken away, so that the things that cannot be shaken will remain. Well, then: we are to receive a kingdom which cannot be shaken! This calls for gratitude! That’s how to offer God true and acceptable worship, reverently and with fear. Our God, you see, is a devouring fire. (New Testament for Everyone)
The author issues a warning here "that if the fearful presence and voice of God from the heavenly city is greater than the theophany at Sinai, then how much greater and terrifying will be the judgment of God on those who reject God's voice in the new covenant era?" The author "masterfully recapitulates previous warnings" regarding the dangers of apostasy in the letter (2:1–4; 3:7–4:13; 10:26–31). The readers are to "watch out" (blepō) that they do not "refuse God who now speaks from heaven. The author and the community to whom he writes ("we") will not be able to escape the final judgment if they turn away [apostrephō] from the one who warns from heaven (12:25, 29). God is viewed as a consuming fire, a thought that alludes to his judgment against enemies and those who violate his covenant (cf. Deut 4:23–24; 9:3; Isa 33:14). Our author has in mind a burning judgment and picture of final destruction akin with early apocalyptic traditions (Isa 66:16, 24; Zeph 1:18; 1 En. 91.9; 4 Ezra 7.38; 2 Bar. 44.15). Put differently, if the malaise Christian community that suffers from dullness of hearing commit apostasy by rejecting God's message, then God will consume them with a fiery punishment at the eschaton." Since the believing community is "in the process of inheriting an unshakable kingdom, the appropriate way to worship God, then, is for all believers to show gratitude (Heb 12:28)," and render service that is pleasing to God with "godly fear" and "reverence/awe". "Again the author uses fear as a strategy in his warning (4:1; 10:27, 31; 12:21; cf. 11:7). The believers are exhorted to worship God acceptably and not commit apostasy” so they can finally enter into God's presence in his future heavenly kingdom.

Conditional security in the book of James
 James 1:12 – Blessed is the one who perseveres under trial because, having stood the test, that person will receive the crown of life that the Lord has promised to those who love him. (NIV)
"[T]he word "blessed" has both present and future connotations." "[T]hose who have persevered in trusting and loving" the Lord "in the face of trials" are "qualified to be called 'blessed'." For the Lord has promised to give them "the crown of life," which means "'the crown that consists in eternal life'"— "the life of the age to come" which is equivalent to inheriting the kingdom of God in James 2:5. "Their love for God is the outcome of their faith in him which produces willing endurance for him (1:2-4). Love is the essence of true faith" and trials have a way of testing a Christians "love as well as faith."
 James 5:19–20 – My brothers, if anyone among you wanders from the truth and someone brings him back, let him know that whoever brings back a sinner from his wandering will save his soul from death and will cover a multitude of sins. (ESV)
It was customary to end such a letter with a summary (James 5:7–11), an oath (James 5:12), a health wish (James 5:13–18) and a purpose statement (James 5:19–20). This verse, then, should be part of the statement of the purpose of the whole letter. That in itself is reason enough to assign it great importance. The condition this verse speaks to is described in James 5:19. A Christian ("one of you") has erred. James gives us plenty of illustrations of this in the letter. The errors he addresses are those of partiality and greed, of anger and jealousy. All of them are found within the church. Such error calls for another Christian ("someone") to point it out so that the person can repent and be restored ("bring him back"). That, of course, is what the entire letter is about, bringing the Christians he addresses back to proper Christian behavior. This is indeed the purpose statement of James. Therefore, the sinner in this verse is a Christian who has fallen into sin, such as greed or criticism of others. This Christian brother or sister has erred or gone the wrong way—the text is not talking about an individual sin, however "serious" we may consider it, from which the believer quickly repents. As Jesus points out in Matthew 7:13–14 . . . there are two ways. The way that leads to life is narrow and difficult, while the one leading to death is broad and easy. Unfortunately there are many ways to get from the narrow to the broad way. This Christian (the sinner) has taken one of them and is observed by another, whom we shall call the rescuer. The question is, Who is saved from death—the sinner or the rescuer? . . . It seems to me that James's message is that the sinner is the one rescued from death by the rescuer's efforts. There are four reasons for this. First, the fact that sins are covered (an adaptation of Proverbs 10:12: "Love covers all wrongs") seems to refer to the sinner's sins, not the potential sin of the rescuer. Only the sinner has erred in the context. Second, the word order in the Greek text makes it more likely that it is the sinner who is delivered from death. Third, the very picture of turning a person from his wandering way . . . suggests that it is the error that is putting the individual in danger of death. . . . What, then, is the death that the person is saved from?
A few commentators suggest that this death refers to "physical death," But most commentators see death in James 5:20 as referring to spiritual or eternal death. 
Both testaments view death as the end result of sin, usually referring to death in terms of eternal death or condemnation at the last judgment (Deut. 30:19; Job 8:13; Psalm 1:6; Psalm 2:12; Jeremiah 23:12; Jude 23; Rev. 20:14). James has already mentioned this in James 1:15: desire gives birth to sin, which results in death. That death is contrasted with the life that God gives (James 1:18). Since death and life are parallel ideas, it is likely that they are not physical but eternal . . . . This parallel, plus the seriousness of the tone in James 5, indicates that it is this sort of death, the ultimate death that sin brings about, which is in view. What James is saying, then, is that a Christian may err from the way of life. When another Christian attempts to rescue him or her, it is not a hopeless action. Such a rescue effort, if successful, will deliver [i.e., save, sōzō] that erring person from eternal death. That is because the sins will be covered (the language is that of the Old Testament sacrifice; when atonement was made the sin was said to be covered as if literally covered by the blood). It may be one simple action of rescue, but it can lead to the covering of "a multitude of sins." In stating this, James shows his own pastor's heart and encourages all Christians to follow in his footsteps, turning their erring brothers and sisters back from the way of death.

Conditional security in the books of 2 Peter and Jude
 2 Peter 1:3–11 – His divine power has given us everything required for life and godliness through the knowledge of him who called us by his own glory and goodness. By these he has given us very great and precious promises, so that through them you may share in the divine nature, escaping the corruption that is in the world because of evil desire. For this very reason, make every effort to supplement your faith with goodness, goodness with knowledge, knowledge with self-control, self-control with endurance, endurance with godliness, godliness with brotherly affection, and brotherly affection with love. For if you possess these qualities in increasing measure, they will keep you from being useless or unfruitful in the knowledge of our Lord Jesus Christ. The person who lacks these things is blind and shortsighted and has forgotten the cleansing from his past sins. Therefore, brothers and sisters, make every effort to confirm your calling and election, because if you do these things you will never stumble [or "fall," ESV, "fall away," NLT]. For in this way, entry into the eternal kingdom of our Lord and Savior Jesus Christ will be richly provided for you. (CSB)
"In 2 Peter 1:5–7 we discover a chain of virtues that Christians are strongly encouraged … to develop" (i.e., "make every effort," CSB, NET, NIV). This encouragement to moral effort is not surprising since the false teachers in 2 Peter are false precisely because they are not making any effort to live morally, and are setting "a wrong moral example" that encourages Christians to follow in their footsteps. Of significance in this list of virtues is that faith is first. "Trusting God is the root from which all the other virtues spring." Peter's theology here agrees "with Paul's, who said that faith expresses itself in love (Gal. 5:6). All the godly virtues find their source in faith" and culminate in love. If Christians "keep on doing" (v. 10, ISV) these godly virtues, they "will never fall [ptaiō]" (v. 10, ESV) or "fall away" (NLT, GOD’S WORD), 'that is, they will never forsake God, abandon him, and commit apostasy." Notice that v. 10 is connected to v. 11 by "For in this way." "The 'way,' of course, is the pathway of virtue, the keeping of the qualities in vv. 5–7, which were mentioned again in v. 10." By living godly lives through God's power Christ "will provide entrance into the kingdom for believers." For Peter, "the ethical fruits of Christian faith are objectively necessary for the attainment of final salvation." This teaching on the importance of moral living was needed since "His readers were in danger of moral apostasy, under the influence of [false] teachers who evidently held that immorality incurred no danger of [eternal] judgment." Peter believes "that without moral living one will not enter the kingdom which is precisely what Paul also believed (1 Cor 6:9–10; Gal 5:21)." Thus, according to Peter, "A person cannot sit around … after conversion … and assume 'once saved, always saved' regardless of one's postconversion conduct." "Peter assumes the possibility of their apostasy" with the consequent "forfeiture of eternal life" that is experienced in the kingdom ruled by the Lord Jesus. "But the apostle insists that such apostasy ... does not have to happen to any Christian. And it will never happen if we live each day by an abiding faith in Christ." A "faith that is demonstrated by growth in the Christian" virtues mentioned here.
 2 Peter 2:18–22 – For speaking out arrogant words of vanity they entice by fleshly desires, by sensuality, those who barely escape from the ones who live in error, promising them freedom while they themselves are slaves of corruption; for by what a man is overcome, by this he is enslaved. For if, after they have escaped the defilements of the world by the knowledge of the Lord and Savior Jesus Christ, they are again entangled in them and are overcome, the last state has become worse for them than the first. For it would be better for them not to have known the way of righteousness, than having known it, to turn away from the holy commandment handed on to them. It has happened to them according to the true proverb, "A dog returns to its own vomit," and, "A sow, after washing, returns to wallowing in the mire." (NASB 1995)
This passage follows "a relatively simple outline: verses 18, 19 [deals with] the attempts of the false teachers to lure believers astray; verses 20, 21 [deals with] the apostasy which they [the false teachers] exemplify; verse 22 [is] an illustrative analogy." "Peter warns" that these false teachers "will lure those who are still weak in faith back into sin. These Christians ... had begun to put lives that were mired in sin behind them," but now they are being "seduced by these teachers" to "go right back to the filth from which they had so recently been cleansed." Notice, the false teachers "promise the new converts freedom in a lustful life, but they themselves were slaves of the very moral corruption they were enticing others to embrace." How deceitful it is to tell Christians "'You can believe in Jesus and be free to live an immoral life.'" "The key verses to consider, in discussing apostasy … are verses 20, 21. … That these whom Peter regards as apostates had a genuine Christian experience is seen in at least three ways."
First, they "escaped [apopheugō] the defilements of the world," which recalls 2 Peter 1:4 ("having escaped [apopheugō] the corruption that is in the world"). David Kuske notes that "they escaped" (apopheugō) with "The preposition [apo] used as a prefix makes [pheugō] a perfective verb, that is, it stresses not only that people escaped but that they made a complete, total escape. As Christians, they turned their back completely on the sinful actions of their former way of life." at "the time of their conversion." Second, this escape was accomplished "by the knowledge [epignōsis] of the Lord and Savior, Jesus Christ." Peter's use of epignōsis here and in 2 Peter 1:2, 3, leave us in no doubt about whether they were once saved, for "he uses this compound [word] for knowledge consciously as a way of representing the saving knowledge of Christ one gains at conversion." "Third, they 'have come to know the way of righteousness'" ("meaning a righteous lifestyle"). "The verb [epiginōskō] 'have come to know' is cognate to the noun epignōsis just referred to." It "refers to saving knowledge, to the experience of coming to know this 'way.' The tense of the verb (Greek perfect) indicates a continuing state that is a result of a prior act. They entered into this knowledge at conversion and continue to possess that knowledge afterward." With all these in mind, "it would be hard to find a better description of what it means to become a Christian." Indeed, "There can be little doubt that the false teachers had once been orthodox Christians;" "true followers of Jesus Christ." "The 'way of righteousness' [which the false teachers had at one time fully embraced] is obviously the same as 'the way of truth' in verse 2 and 'the straight way' in verse 15." Furthermore, it is equivalent to "the holy commandment" passed on to them. Unfortunately, these once orthodox Christians have "turned away" (hupostrephō) from following the way of righteousness or holy commandments delivered to them. This "implies that they have returned to their former way of life and thus committed … apostasy" (i.e. become unbelievers). This is an "ethical apostasy," which is an act of "deconversion." Finally, Peter illustrates what has happened to these former Christians with two proverbs that convey the same point. "Like a dog that comes back to lick up the spoiled vomit that sickened him in the first place, like a sow that gets a bath and goes back to the mud from which she had been cleansed, these apostates return to the enslaving, polluting wickedness from which they had been delivered." Calvinists try to get around Peter's teaching here "by suggesting that the real nature of the sow or the dog had not been changed, and that this implies that these apostate false teachers were never regenerated" or saved to begin with. But this is simply "pressing the illustration beyond what they are intended to convey. Indeed, the proverbs must be interpreted by the clearer words that precede them and not the other way around. The previous paragraph [i.e., verses 20–21] expresses precisely what the proverbs are intended to convey. … Peter is describing a real apostasy from genuine Christianity." "If all we had of the New Testament was 2 Peter, then there would be no question about the possibility of true believers abandoning the faith. The author of 2 Peter seems to leave no doubt about the initial conversion of the false-teachers (v. 20—they came to the saving knowledge—epignosis) who have now, according to his estimation, left the faith and are in danger of eternal damnation." Indeed, "Peter has already told us of their end: 'Blackest darkness is reserved for them' (2 Pet 2:17)." Based on this passage, "Our author does not believe in eternal security."
 2 Peter 3:16–18 – Some things in them [Paul's letters] are hard to understand, which ignorant and unstable people distort, leading to their own destruction, as they do the rest of the Scriptures. And so, dear friends, since you already know these things, continually be on your guard not to be carried away by the deception [or “error,” ESV, NET] of lawless people. Otherwise, you may fall from your secure position. Instead, continue to grow in the grace and knowledge of our Lord and Savior Jesus, the Messiah. Glory belongs to him both now and on that eternal day! Amen. (ISV)
"Instead of being faithful to Paul and his presentation of the gospel, the false teachers have distorted his message." "They twist his teaching ... as even the other Scriptures," and they do this to their own "eternal destruction" (Greek: apōleia), which entails "the loss of eternal life" and "the final loss of salvation." "The problem of the false teachers is not that they have poorly understood portions of divine revelation but that they use their twisted interpretation to justify their immorality (e.g., 2:19; 3:3-4). Twisted teaching and twisted practice go hand in hand." Peter's "dear friends" have been forewarned in advance—they are to continually be on guard against being "carried away" (Greek: synapagō) by the error and deception of the false teachers who are already "seducing the unstable" in the congregation. David Kuske says the verb synapagō "means 'to drag away together with others," and the passive voice indicates that this action would be done to Peter's readers" by the false teachers. If a believer winds up embracing the heretical beliefs and practices of these false teachers, they will "apostatize," or "fall" (Greek: ekpiptō) from their secure position. Jörg Frey says the word fall (ekpiptō) is likely used here because piptō, fall, "and other composites are conventionally used for apostasy and ethical decline (cf. Rom 11:11, 22; 1 Cor 10:12; Gal 5:4; Heb 4:11; Rev 2:5; 1 Clem. 59:4; 2 Clem. 2.6; 5.7)." Peter is issuing a "severe warning." His readers have been "informed in advance about the nature of the false teachers and the danger they pose, and should therefore be on guard against the temptation to apostasy from the true faith and the ethical way of life, because this would inevitably entail the loss of salvation and destruction." He "has clarified in the entire letter that those who fall away" (or commit apostasy, like the false teachers have done), "are destined for eternal destruction. Believers maintain their secure position ... by heeding warnings, not by ignoring them." "The apostle recognizes that the best antidote against apostasy is a Christian life that is growing." Therefore, Peter urges them in his final exhortation to "continue to grow in the grace and knowledge of our Lord and Savior Jesus, the Messiah." This growth in grace and knowledge "is the strongest antidote against the destructive lures of the false teachers."
 Jude 20–21 – But you, beloved, building yourselves up in your most holy faith and praying in the Holy Spirit, keep yourselves in the love of God, waiting for the mercy of our Lord Jesus Christ that leads to eternal life. (ESV)

Conditional security in the epistles of John
 1 John 2:15-17 – Do not be loving the world, nor the things in the world. If anyone is loving the world, the love of the Father is not in him. Because everything in the world—the desire of  the flesh, and the desire of the eyes, and the boastful-pride of life—is not from the Father, but is from the world. And the world is passing-away, and its desire. But the one doing the will of God abides ["remains," CSB, NET; "lives," NIV, GOD’S WORD] forever. (DLNT)
The addresses are explicitly commanded and "warned not to love the world" because "everything in it [i.e., the desire of the flesh, desire of the eyes, and the boastful-pride of life ] is dangerous" and "can lead a person to fall away from God." A believer cannot love the world and love God the Father at the same time. "Loving the world leads to falling away from God, the most serious thing that can happen to a believer." The young believers are identified by the writer as "victors over the evil one" in 2:13-14. They are victors because they are "holding fast to God's word" (2:14) and "their faith in Jesus as the messiah, the son of God (4:4)." However, if they allow themselves to be seduced by the allurements of the world, they will "fall away from this faith, [and] they will go lost [eternally]. The world is passing away (v. 17)" but "eternal life belongs to those who do God's will, to those who love the Father and follow his commandments (v. 17)."
 1 John 2:18–27 – Children, it is the last hour. And as you have heard, "Antichrist is coming," even now many antichrists have come. We know from this that it is the last hour. They went out from us, but they did not belong to us; for if they had belonged to us, they would have remained with us. However, they went out so that it might be made clear that none of them belongs to us. But you have an anointing from the Holy One, and all of you have knowledge. I have not written to you because you don't know the truth, but because you do know it, and because no lie comes from the truth. Who is the liar, if not the one who denies that Jesus is the Messiah? This one is the antichrist: the one who denies the Father and the Son. No one who denies the Son can have the Father; he who confesses the Son has the Father as well. What you have heard from the beginning must remain in you. If what you have heard from the beginning remains in you, then you will remain in the Son and in the Father. And this is the promise that He Himself made to us: eternal life. I have written these things to you about those who are trying to deceive you. The anointing you received from Him remains in you, and you don't need anyone to teach you. Instead, His anointing teaches you about all things and is true and is not a lie; just as He has taught you, remain in Him. (HCSB)
 2 John 7–11 – Many deceivers have gone out into the world; they do not confess the coming of Jesus Christ in the flesh. This is the deceiver and the antichrist. Watch yourselves so you don't lose what we have worked for, but that you may receive a full reward. Anyone who does not remain in Christ's teaching but goes beyond it, does not have God. The one who remains in that teaching, this one has both the Father and the Son. If anyone comes to you and does not bring this teaching, do not receive him into your home, and don't say, "Welcome," to him; for the one who says, "Welcome," to him shares in his evil works. (HCSB)

Conditional security in the book of Revelation
A major theme in the book of Revelation concerns the Greek word nikaō which means "to … conquer, overcome, prevail, get the victory." Its meaning is reflected in modern translations of Rev. 2:7,
 
"To the one who overcomes, I will grant to eat from the tree of life, which is in the Paradise of God." (NASB 2020)

"To the one who conquers …." (NET, ESV, CSB)

"To the one who is victorious …." (NIV; EHV)

The Greek verb nikaō appears eight times (2:7, 11, 17, 26; 3:5, 12, 21; 21:7) as a present participle which is translated "literally [as] the one overcoming or conquering." "The present participle implies continuous victory, 'keeps on overcoming' or 'continues to be victorious.'" Thus, Christians are "in the process of conquering" and will receive the promises only if they "carry out the process to its completion."
Overcoming/conquering in these verses refers to "Christians that hold fast their faith even unto death against the power of their foes, and their temptations and persecutions." Overcoming/Conquering simply "means persevering in faith," which entails an "active trust in God that leads to faithfulness in the difficult situations of life lived for Christ." Each of the seven churches are given a promise on the condition of overcoming/conquering that differs from one another, but "each contains in some form the anticipation of eternal life" or "final salvation [with God] in the time of the new Jerusalem." This is confirmed by the final promise found in Revelation 21:7, "The one overcoming will inherit these things, and I will be God to him and he will be a son to Me" (DLNT). "The pronoun . . . 'these things,' refers to the blessings of eschatological [i.e., future and final] salvation enumerated in v. 4 (i.e., no sorrow, death, mourning, tears, or pain)." Alexander Stewart states, "Each of the seven initial promises [proclaimed to the seven churches] point forward to the visions of final salvation at the end of the Apocalypse (Revelation 20–22). Altogether they illustrate one of John's primary motivational strategies: hearers should strive to overcome in order to gain final salvation. Final salvation is dependent upon a human response of overcoming." Christians must be conquering/overcoming, that is, "remaining faithful [to Jesus], even to death, in order to experience glorious, everlasting life with God, the Lamb, and all the redeemed in God's new heaven and earth." Of course, the "Failure to overcome necessarily entails failure to receive the promises and the resultant exclusion from God's new creation."
 Revelation 2:10–11 – "Do not fear what you are about to suffer. Behold, the devil is about to cast some of you into prison, so that you will be tested, and you will have tribulation for ten days. Be faithful until death, and I [Jesus] will give you the crown of life. He who has an ear, let him hear what the Spirit says to the churches He who overcomes will not be hurt by the second death." (NASB) 
"The persecution would be a time for testing of the church's faith. The time of affliction would be brief ("ten days," that is, an indeterminate, short period) but may result in death for some of the faithful. They were not to fear," but "Keep on being faithful" in the midst of the devils efforts "to lead the faithful into apostasy." If they "Keep on proving faithful unto death" Christ will give them "the 'crown' which consists in eternal life," "eternal life … in the coming Kingdom." Jesus calls "all [Christians] to faithfulness, which is what it means to conquer" in the book of Revelation. Therefore, those who "Continue to be faithful" to Jesus until death consist of those who are presently "conquering" "all the godless and antichristian powers" waring against them. Christians who are conquering (i.e., "persevering in faith") are promised to never experience "the second death" (2:11) which entails "exclusion from participation in God's final kingdom” and "eternal damnation in hell" (cf. 20:6, 14; 21:8).
 Revelation 3:4–5 – "But you have a few people in Sardis who have not soiled their garments; and they will walk with Me in white, for they are worthy. He who overcomes will thus be clothed in white garments; and I will not erase his name from the book of life, and I will confess his name before My Father and before His angels." (NASB)
 Revelation 3:10–11 – And to the angel of the church in Philadelphia write: "This is what the holy one, the true one, the one who has the key of David, the one who opens and no one can shut, and who shuts and no one can open, says: I know your works (behold, I have put before you an opened door that no one is able to shut) that you have a little strength, and have kept my word, and did not deny my name. Behold, I am causing those of the synagogue of Satan, the ones who call themselves Jews and are not, but are lying—behold, I will make them come and kneel down before your feet and acknowledge that I have loved you. Because you have kept the word of my patient endurance [or "perseverance," NASB 1995] I also will keep you from the hour of testing that is about to come upon the whole inhabited world, to put to the test those who live on the earth. I am coming quickly! Hold fast [or "Hold on," NET, NIV] to what you have, so that no one may take away your crown. The one who conquers, I will make him a pillar in the temple of my God, and he will never go outside again, and I will write on him the name of my God and the name of the city of my God, the new Jerusalem that comes down from heaven from my God, and my new name." (Lexham English Bible)
The Philadelphian Christians are praised by Jesus: they "did not deny my name" (3:9), but "kept my word" (3:8), and "kept the word of my patient endurance" or perseverance (3:10). "This passage assumes that those who identify with Jesus' 'name' are being pressured to deny their faith" "Despite Jesus' praises for the Philadelphian Christians' perseverance to this point, however, 'it's not over till it's over.' They must continue to hold fast what they have (3:11), that is, to continue to keep the message that demands their perseverance (3:10), lest their persecutors seize from them their crown (3:11; cf. 2:25)." "[T]he crown of life in Revelation 2:10 is … eternal life itself" which Christ gives to those who remain faithful to Jesus until death. In 3:11, this "crown" also represents "eternal life," as a present possession that Christians must "be holding-on-to" (Disciples Literal New Testament) in light of Jesus's second coming. They must "'hold fast' to their present faith [in Christ] . . . in the face of coming difficulties" or else they will have their crown "taken away." This "is a metaphor for being disqualified in a contest." "The athletic metaphor is appropriate in this letter, since Philadelphia was noted for its [athletic] games and festivals (Mounce 104; Hemer, Letters 165)." The Christian athlete can become disqualified from keeping possession of the crown "of eternal life" through a variety of ways in the book of Revelation. Gwyn Pugh explains,
Jesus alerts believers [throughout the seven letters to the churches] to spiritual enemies that are aggressive, militant, and opportunistic. Believers must be on guard against any temptation, whether imperial pressure to deny Christ, social pressure to compromise with the pagan and idolatrous environment around them, or persecution from unbelieving Jews—not to mention false doctrine, indifference, and spiritual inertia within the churches. Any of these might overcome the believer and have the effect of taking one’s crown. (The Book of Revelation, 196)
Christians are warned, they must be holding fast to one's faith in Christ despite present opposition or else they will find the crown of eternal life they currently possess being "forfeited." "Through unfaithfulness this crown, which includes the blessing of everlasting life, is lost," and one is excluded from entering the kingdom of God along with all the rest who are "unfaithful" (Rev. 21:8, ISV). The doctrine of once saved, always saved "is here clearly denied."
 Revelation 21:7–8 – The person who overcomes ["conquers," ESV, NET] will inherit these things. I will be his God, and he will be my son. But people who are cowardly, unfaithful, detestable, murderers, sexually immoral, sorcerers, idolaters, and all liars will find themselves in the lake that burns with fire and sulfur. This is the second death. (ISV)
Revelation 21:8 concludes this section (vv. 1–8) with a "warning" to Christians about succumbing to temptations that could keep them from being faithful to Jesus until the end as overcomers/conquers. Since "cowardly" is the opposite of the "conqueror," Christians must "decide whether to be a 'conqueror' (21:7) or a 'coward' (21:8)" and share in each of their corresponding destines. In this context, "cowards" are Christians who lack the "courage to offer faithful witness in following the Lamb wherever he might go, specifically to death,"  and who ultimately relinquish "one’s faith in the battle against evil," and become "apostates" (i.e., unbelievers) "The term unfaithful ... stands with the" term coward. Unfaithful [Greek: apistos] "is the opposite of faith [Greek: pistos], which includes loyalty to God and Christ (Rev 2:10; 17:14). If Jesus (1:5; 3:14; 19:11) and Antipas (2:13) were faithful and resist evil," the unfaithful "are the opposite" (cf. Luke 12:46). The book of Revelation calls "all [Christians] to faithfulness, which is what it means to conquer" (see Rev. 2:10-11). Therefore, for a Christian to become unfaithful to Jesus means that they have "turned their backs on him" and failed "to offer the faithful witness that reflects their Lord and his followers." Thus, "When Rev. 21:8 places" the cowardly and the unfaithful "in the lake of fire, it has in view Christians during times of persecution who, out of a fear of suffering, renounce their faith" and become "apostates" (i.e., unbelievers) Since "John's audience is Christians under pressure and threat of persecution, cowardice and faithlessness to the Lord, either spiritually or ethically," must be condemned in the strongest possible manner. "The intended rhetorical effect of this verse was ... to warn the faithful of the dangers of spiritual and moral apostasy."
 Revelation 22:18–19 – I testify to everyone who hears the words of the prophecy contained in this book: If anyone adds to them, God will add to him the plagues described in this book. And if anyone takes away from the words of this book of prophecy, God will take away his share in the tree of life and in the holy city that are described in this book. (NET)
Whether it is Jesus or the author John who is speaking authoritatively as a prophet on behalf of God (commentators differ here), we have in these verses a "severe warning" against distorting or "falsifying the message of Revelation through one's teaching and manner of life." These warnings are meant for "everyone" who "hears" the message of Revelation and "especially … for the seven churches" who were its original recipients. Craig Koester says,
Hearers have already been told to "keep" what is written in the book and that they are blessed through faithfulness to God and Christ (1:3; 22:7, 9). Since "keeping" means obeying the message, then "adding and taking away" are the opposite and connote disobedience.
The words adding/taking away "echoes Moses' teaching in Deuteronomy" (4:2; 12:32), which in context, contain commands against committing idolatry and warn of false prophets who would encourage Israel to worship other gods (Deut. 13:1-5). Since false teachers/prophets are already active in at least two of these churches, enticing God's people to participate in idolatry and immorality (2:14-15, 20), Revelation 22:18-19 also serves as a "warning [to them] that God will punish interpretations of the Christian faith that allow the idolatry, immorality, and compromise with evil that Revelation condemns." Since the warning is addressed to "everyone who hears," it would therefore discourage both Christians and non-Christians "from attempting to tamper with the book's contents." Nevertheless, it must be remembered that this warning was originally given to believers, and thus, if a believer adds/takes away, that is, "change[s] the message God has communicated in the book or prophecy of Revelation" to allow themselves or others to disobey God, they will commit "apostasy" (i.e., "the believer will become an unbeliever") and "will have the plagues of the book added to them; that is, they will be treated as unbelievers and suffer the punishments to be inflicted on the wicked." "Even more severe is the warning that they will lose their share in the tree of life" and the holy city which are references to final salvation with God and His people in the New Jerusalem (Rev. 21–22). "Clearly, failure to keep the prophecy … disqualifies one from the eternal life that awaits in New Jerusalem." In light of these verses, "It is hard to deny … that the author believed that a person could commit apostasy … and so have the privilege of eternal salvation taken away from him. John was not an advocate of 'once saved, always saved' theology."

New Testament Greek in support of conditional security
Arminians find further support for conditional security from numerous Scriptures where the verb "believes" occurs in the Greek present tense. Greek scholars and commentators (both Calvinist and non-Calvinist) have noted that Greek present tense verbs generally refer to continuous action, especially present participles. For example, In his textbook, Basics of Biblical Greek Grammar, Calvinist William D. Mounce writes: "The present participle is built on the present tense stem of the verb. It describes a continuous action. It will often be difficult to carry this 'on-going' nuance into your translation, but this must be the foremost consideration in your mind." Calvinist Daniel Wallace brings out this "on-going" nuance for the present participle "believes" in John 3:16, "Everyone who [continually] believes in him should not perish. ... In this Gospel, there seems to be a qualitative distinction between the ongoing act of believing and the simple fact of believing." He argues for this understanding not simply because believes is in the present tense, "but to the use of the present participle of πιστεύων [pisteuōn, believing], especially in soteriological [i.e., salvation] contexts in the NT." Wallace goes on to elaborate,
The aspectual force of the present [participle] ὁ πιστεύων [the one believing] seems to be in contrast with [the aorist participle] ὁ πιστεύσας [the one having believed]. ... The present [participle for the one believing] occurs six times as often (43 times) [in comparison to the aorist], most often in soteriological contexts (cf. John 1:12; 3:15, 16, 18; 3:36; 6:35, 47, 64; 7:38; 11:25; 12:46; Acts 2:44; 10:43; 13:39; Rom 1:16; 3:22; 4:11, 24; 9:33; 10:4, 11; 1 Cor 1:21; 1 Cor 14:22 [bis]; Gal 3:22; Eph 1:19; 1 Thess 1:7; 2:10, 13; 1 Pet 2:6, 7; 1 John 5:1, 5, 10, 13). Thus, it seems that since the aorist participle was a live option to describe a "believer," it is unlikely that when the present was used, it was aspectually flat. The present was the tense of choice most likely because the New Testament writers by and large saw continual belief as a necessary condition of salvation. Along these lines, it seems significant that the promise of salvation is almost always given to ὁ πιστεύων [the one believing] (cf. several of the above cited texts), almost never to ὁ πιστεύσας [the one having believed] (apart from Mark 16:16, John 7:39 and Heb 4:3 come the closest . . .).

Arminian Greek scholar J. Harold Greenlee supplies the following literal translation of several verses where the Greek word translated "believes" (in our modern translations) occurs in the tense of continuous action.

Of further significance is that "In many cases the results of the believing are also given in a continuous tense. As we keep believing, we keep on having eternal life (John 3:15, 16, 36; 20:31)." It is this type of evidence which leads Arminians to conclude that "eternal security is firmly promised to 'the one believing'—the person who continues to believe in Christ—but not to "the one having believed,"—the person who has merely exercised one single act of faith some time in the past." Indeed, "Just as becoming saved is conditioned upon faith, staying saved is conditioned upon continuing to believe."

Scriptures that appear to contradict conditional security
Those who hold to perseverance of the saints cite a number of verses to support their view. The following are some of the most commonly cited:
 John 5:24 – Truly, truly, I say to you, whoever hears my word and believes him who sent me has eternal life. He does not come into judgment, but has passed from death to life. (ESV)
 John 6:35, 37–40 – Jesus said to them, "I am the bread of life; whoever comes to me shall not hunger, and whoever believes in me shall never thirst. . . . All that the Father gives me will come to me, and whoever comes to me I will never cast out. For I have come down from heaven, not to do my own will but the will of him who sent me. And this is the will of him who sent me, that I should lose nothing of all that he has given me, but raise it up on the last day. For this is the will of my Father, that everyone who looks on the Son and believes in him should have eternal life, and I will raise him up on the last day. (ESV)
 John 10:27–29 – My sheep hear my voice, and I know them, and they follow me. I give them eternal life, and they will never perish, and no one will snatch them out of my hand. My Father, who has given them to me, is greater than all, and no one is able to snatch them out of the Father's hand. (ESV)
 John 17:12 – While I was with them, I kept them in your name, which you have given me. I have guarded them, and not one of them has been lost except the son of destruction, that the Scripture might be fulfilled. (ESV)
 Romans 8:1 – There is therefore now no condemnation for those who are in Christ Jesus. (ESV)
 Romans 8:35, 37–39 – Who shall separate us from the love of Christ? Shall tribulation, or distress, or persecution, or famine, or nakedness, or danger, or sword? ... No, in all these things we are more than conquerors through him who loved us. For I am sure that neither death nor life, nor angels nor rulers, nor things present nor things to come, nor powers, nor height nor depth, nor anything else in all creation, will be able to separate us from the love of God in Christ Jesus our Lord. (ESV)
 1 Corinthians 1:8–9 – [God] who will sustain you to the end, guiltless in the day of our Lord Jesus Christ. God is faithful, by whom you were called into the fellowship of his Son, Jesus Christ our Lord. (ESV)
 1 Corinthians 10:13 – No temptation has overtaken you that is not common to man. God is faithful, and he will not let you be tempted beyond your ability, but with the temptation he will also provide the way of escape, that you may be able to endure it. (ESV)
 Ephesians 1:13–14 – In him you also, when you heard the word of truth, the gospel of your salvation, and believed in him, were sealed with the promised Holy Spirit, who is the guarantee of our inheritance until we acquire possession of it, to the praise of his glory. (ESV)
 Philippians 1:6 – And I am sure of this, that he who began a good work in you will bring it to completion at the day of Jesus Christ. (ESV)
 2 Timothy 4:18 – The Lord will rescue me from every evil deed and bring me safely into his heavenly kingdom. To him be the glory forever and ever. Amen. (ESV)
 Hebrews 7:25 – Therefore, He is able also to save forever those who draw near to God through Him, since He always lives to make intercession for them. (NASB)
 1 Peter 1:5 – ... who are protected by the power of God through faith for a salvation ready to be revealed in the last time. (NASB)
 1 John 3:9 – No one who is born of God will continue to sin, because God's seed remains in him; he cannot go on sinning, because he has been born of God. (NIV)
 Jude 24–25 – To him who is able to keep you from falling and to present you before his glorious presence without fault and with great joy—to the only God our Savior be glory, majesty, power and authority, through Jesus Christ our Lord, before all ages, now and forevermore! Amen. (NIV)

Arminians would argue that they have adequately provided explanations for how these verses and others can be easily reconciled with conditional security.

Agreements and disagreements with opposing views
A major difference between traditional Calvinists and Arminians is how they define apostasy (see Perseverance of the saints for the definition as it is referred to here).

Traditional Calvinist view
Traditional Calvinists say apostasy refers to people who fall away (apostatize) from a profession of faith, but who have never actually entered into a saving relationship with God through Christ. As noted earlier, Arminians understand that apostasy refers to a believer who has departed from a genuine saving relationship with God by developing "an evil, unbelieving heart." (Hebrews 3:12)

In traditional Calvinism the doctrine of the perseverance of the saints "does not stand alone but is a necessary part of the Calvinistic system of theology." The Calvinist doctrines of Unconditional Election and Irresistible Grace "logically imply the certain salvation of those who receive these blessings." If God has eternally and unconditionally elected (chosen) some men to eternal life, and if His Spirit irresistibly applies to them the benefits of salvation, then the inescapable conclusion is that these persons will be saved forever. Arminians acknowledge that the Calvinistic system is logically consistent if certain presuppositions are true, but they do not agree with these presuppositions, which include the Calvinist doctrines of unconditional election and irresistible grace.

Traditional Calvinists agree with Arminians on the need for persevering in faith
Baptist scholar James Leo Garrett says it is important for people recognize that traditional Calvinist and Arminians "do not differ as to whether continuing faith in Jesus Christ will be necessary for final or eschatological salvation. Both agree that it is so. Rather, they differ as to whether all Christians or all true believers will continue in faith to the end." For example, Anthony Hoekema, longtime Professor of Calvin Theological Seminary, stated: "Peter puts it vividly: We are kept by the power of God through faith [1 Peter 1:5]—a living faith, which expresses itself through love (Galatians 5:6). In other words, we may never simply rest on the comfort of God's preservation apart from the continuing exercise of faith." Hoekema even writes that he agrees with Arminian writer Robert Shank when he says,

There is no warrant in the New Testament for that strange at-ease-in-Zion definition of perseverance which assures Christians that perseverance is inevitable and relieves them of the necessity of deliberately persevering in faith, encouraging them to place confidence in some past act or experience.

Reformed Presbyterian James Denney stated:
And there is nothing superficial in what the New Testament calls faith . . . it is [man's] absolute committal of himself for ever to the sin-bearing love of God for salvation. It is not simply the act of an instant, it is the attitude of a life; it is the one right thing at the moment when a man abandons himself to Christ, and it is the one thing which keeps him right with God for ever. . . . Grace is the attitude of God to man which is revealed and made sure in Christ, and the only way in which it becomes effective in us for new life is when it wins [from] us the response of faith. And just as grace is the whole attitude of God in Christ to sinful men, so faith is the whole attitude of the sinful soul as it surrenders itself to that grace. Whether we call it the life of the justified, or the life of the reconciled, or the life of the regenerate, or the life of grace or of love, the new life is the life of faith and nothing else. To maintain the original attitude of welcoming God's love as it is revealed in Christ bearing our sins—not only to trust it, but to go on trusting—not merely to believe in it as a mode of transition from the old to the new, but to keep on believing—to say with every breath we draw, "Thou, O Christ, art all I want; more than all in Thee I find"—is not a part of the Christian life, but the whole of it.

Free Grace or non-traditional Calvinist view
The non-traditional Calvinist or Free Grace view disagrees with Traditional Calvinists and Arminians in holding that saving faith in Christ must continue in order for a person to remain in their saving relationship with God. For example, Zane Hodges says: "... We miss the point to insist that true saving faith must necessarily continue. Of course, our faith in Christ should continue. But the claim that it absolutely must ... has no support at all in the Bible" Joseph Dillow writes:

Even though Robert Shank would not agree, it is definitely true that saving faith is "the act of a single moment whereby all the benefits of Christ's life, death, and resurrection suddenly become the irrevocable possession of the individual, per se, despite any and all eventualities."

Any and all eventualities would include apostasy—falling away or walking away from the Christian faith and to "cease believing." What a Christian forfeits when he falls away is not his saving relationship with God but the opportunity to reign with Christ in his coming kingdom.

Lewis Sperry Chafer, in his book Salvation, provides a concise summary of the Free Grace position: "Saving faith is an act: not an attitude. Its work is accomplished when its object has been gained."

Traditional Calvinists agree with Arminians against the Free Grace view
Traditional Calvinists and Arminians disagree with the Free Grace view on biblical and theological grounds. For example, Calvinist Tony Lane writes:

The two historic views discussed so far [Traditional Calvinism and Arminianism] are agreed that salvation requires perseverance [in faith]. More recently, however, a third view has emerged [i.e., non-traditional Calvinist or Free Grace], according to which all who are converted will be saved regardless of how they then live. They will be saved even if they immediately renounce their faith and lead a life of debauched atheism. Many people today find this view attractive, but it is blatantly unbiblical. There is much in the New Testament that makes it clear that discipleship is not an optional extra and that remaining faithful is a condition of salvation. The whole letter to the Hebrews focuses on warning Jewish believers not to forsake Christ and so lose their salvation. Also, much of the teaching of Jesus warns against thinking that a profession of faith is of use if it is not backed up by our lives. Apart from being unbiblical, this approach is dangerous, for a number of reasons. It encourages a false complacency, the idea that there can be salvation without discipleship. ... Also it encourages a 'tip and run' approach to evangelism which is concerned only to lead people to make a 'decision', with scant concern about how these 'converts' will subsequently live. This is in marked contrast to the attitude of the apostle Paul, who was deeply concerned about his converts' lifestyle and discipleship. One only needs to read Galatians or 1 Corinthians to see that he did not hold to this recent view. The author of Hebrews was desperately concerned that his readers might lose their salvation by abandoning Christ. ... These three letters make no sense if salvation is guaranteed by one single 'decision for Christ'. This view is pastorally disastrous.

Scot McKnight and J. Rodman Williams represent the opinion of Arminians on this view:
 "Christians of all sorts tend to agree on this point: to be finally saved, to enter eternally into the presence of God, the new heavens and the new earth, and into the [final eternal] 'rest,' a person needs to persevere. The oddest thing has happened in evangelicalism though. It [i.e., non-traditional Calvinism] has taught ... the idea of 'once saved, always saved' as if perseverance were not needed. This is neither Calvinism nor Arminianism but a strange and unbiblical hybrid of both. ... [Non-traditional Calvinists] have taught that if a person has crossed the threshold by receiving Christ, but then decides to abandon living for him, that person is eternally secure. This is rubbish theology because the New Testament does not hold such cavalier notions of security."

"Any claim to security by virtue of the great salvation we have in Christ without regard to the need for continuing in faith is totally mistaken and possibly tragic in its results. ... A doctrine of 'perseverance of the saints' that does not affirm its occurrence through faith is foreign to Scripture, a serious theological misunderstanding, and a liability to Christian existence."

Harry Jessop succinctly states the Arminian position: "Salvation, while in its initial stages made real in the soul through an act of faith, is maintained within the soul by a life of faith, manifested in faithfulness."

Christian denominations that affirm the possibility of apostasy
The following Christian denominations affirm their belief in the possibility of apostasy in either their articles or statements of faith, or by way of a position paper.

 Anabaptist Churches
 Mennonite Church
 Missionary Church
 Eastern Orthodox Churches
 Evangelical Congregational Church
 General Baptists
 General Association of General Baptists
 National Association of Free Will Baptists
 Lutheran Churches
 Lutheran Church–Missouri Synod
 Methodist Churches (Wesleyan-Arminianism)
 Evangelical Wesleyan Church
 The United Methodist Church
 Free Methodist Church
 The Salvation Army
 Church of the Nazarene
 Church of God (Anderson, Indiana)
 Pentecostal Churches
 Assemblies of God
 Quakerism
 Evangelical Friends Church - Eastern Region
 Restorationist Churches
 Churches of Christ
 Roman Catholic Church

See also

 Antinomianism
 Apostasy in Christianity
 Backsliding
 Corporate election
 Eternal sin
 Perseverance of the saints has articles in the external links that support its position

Notes

References

 Arminius, James. The Works of Arminius, translated by James and William Nichols (Grand Rapids: Baker Book House, 1986).
 Arrington, French L. Unconditional Eternal Security: Myth or Truth? (Tennessee: Pathway Press, 2005).
 Ashby, Stephen M. "Reformed Arminianism," Four Views on Eternal Security, editor J. Matthew Pinson (Grand Rapids: Zondervan, 2002).
 Atwood, Craig D., Hill, Samuel S., and Mead, Frank S. Handbook of Denominations in the United States, 12th Edition (Nashville: Abingdon Press, 2005).
 Bercot, David W, editor. A Dictionary of Early Christian Beliefs: A Reference Guide to More Than 700 Topics Discussed by the Early Church Fathers (Peabody: Hendrickson Publishers, 1998).
 Bercot, David W. Will the Real Heretics Please Stand Up: A New Look at Today's Evangelical Church in the Light of Early Christianity (Amberson: Scroll Publishing Company, 1989).
 Boettner, Loraine. The Reformed Doctrine of Predestination (Phillipsburg: Presbyterian and Reformed Publishing House, 1932).
 Brown, Colin, editor, The New International Dictionary of New Testament Theology, 3 Volumes (Grand Rapids: Regency Reference Library/Zondervan, 1975–1978).
 Claybrook, Frederick W. Jr. Once Saved, Always Saved? A New Testament Study of Apostasy (Lanham: University Press of American, 2003).
 Davis, John Jefferson. "The Perseverance of the Saints: A History of the Doctrine," Journal of the Evangelical Theological Society 34:2 (June 1991), 213–228.
 DeJong, Peter Y. Crisis in the Reformed Churches: Essays in Commemoration of the Great Synod of Dordt, 1618–1619 (Grand Rapids: Reformed Fellowship, Inc., 1968).
 Dillow, Joseph. The Reign of the Servant Kings: A Study of Eternal Security and the Final Significance of Man (Hayesville: Schoettle Publishing Co., 1992).
 Ellis, Mark A, translator and editor. The Arminian Confession of 1621 (Eugene: Pickwick Publications, 2005).
 Greenlee, J. Harold. Words from the Word: 52 Word Studies from the Original New Testament Greek (Salem: Schmul Publishing, 2000).
 Hoekema, Anthony. Saved by Grace (Grand Rapids: William B. Eerdmans Publishing Co., 1989).
 Jessop, Harry E. That Burning Question of Final Perseverance (Indiana: Light and Life Press, 1942).
 Marshall, I. Howard. Kept by the Power of God: A Study of Perseverance and Falling Away (Minneapolis: Bethany Fellowship, Inc., 1969).
 Muller, Richard A. Dictionary of Greek and Latin Theological Terms: Drawn Principally from Protestant Scholastic Theology (Grand Rapids: Baker Book House, 1985).
 Murray, John. Redemption Accomplished and Applied (Grand Rapids: William B. Eerdmans Publishing Company, 1955).
 Oropeza, B. J. Paul and Apostasy: Eschatology, Perseverance, and Falling Away in the Corinthian Congregation (Tübingen: Mohr Siebeck, 2000).
 Pawson, David. Once Saved, Always Saved? A Study in Perseverance and Inheritance (London: Hodder and Stoughton, 1996).
 Picirilli, Robert. Grace, Faith, Free Will. Contrasting Views of Salvation: Calvinism and Arminianism (Nashville: Randall House Publications, 2002).
 Purkiser, W. T. Security: The False and the True (Kansas City: Beacon Hill Press, 1956).
 Schaff, Philip, editor. The Creeds of Christendom Volume III: The Evangelical Protestant Creeds (Grand Rapids: Baker Book House, 1984).
 Shank, Robert. Life in the Son: A Study of the Doctrine of Perseverance (Minneapolis: Bethany House Publishers, 1960, 1961, 1989).
 Stanley, Charles. Eternal Security: Can You Be Sure? (Nashville: Oliver-Nelson Books, 1990).
 Steele, Daniel. Mile-Stone Papers: Doctrinal, Ethical, and Experimental on Christian Progress (New York: Nelson and Phillips, 1878).
 Wesley, John. The Works of John Wesley, Third Edition Complete and Unabridged, 14 Vols. (Grand Rapids: Baker Book House, 2001).
 Williams, J. Rodman. Renewal Theology: Systematic Theology from a Charismatic Perspective, 3 Vols. in One (Grand Rapids: Zondervan, 1996).
 Witherington, Ben. John's Wisdom: A Commentary on the Fourth Gospel (Louisville: Westminster John Knox Press, 1995).
 Yocum, Dale. Creeds in Contrast: A Study in Calvinism and Arminianism (Salem: Schmul Publishing Co., 1986).

Further reading
 Multiple views

 J. Matthew Pinson, ed. (2002). Four Views on Eternal Security. Zondervan. 
 Herbert W. Bateman IV, ed. (2007). Four Views on the Warning Passages in Hebrews. Kregel Publications. 

 Arminian view

 W. T. Purkiser (1956, 1974 2nd ed.). Security: The False and the True. Beacon Hill Press. 
 Robert Shank (1960). Life in the Son: A Study of the Doctrine of Perseverance. Bethany House Publishers. 
 I. Howard Marshall (1969, 1995 Rev. ed.). Kept by the Power of God: A Study of Perseverance and Falling Away. Paternoster Press. 
 Dale M Yocum (1986). Creeds in Contrast: A Study in Calvinism and Arminianism. Schmul Publishing Co. 
 David Pawson (1996). Once Saved, Always Saved? A Study in Perseverance and Inheritance. Hodder & Stoughton. 
 B. J. Oropeza (2000, 2007). Paul and Apostasy: Eschatology, Perseverance, and Falling Away in the Corinthian Congregation. Wipf & Stock Publishers. 
 B. J. Oropeza (2011). In the Footsteps of Judas and Other Defectors: Apostasy in the New Testament Communities, Volume 1: The Gospels, Acts, and Johannine Letters. Wipf & Stock Publishers. 
 B. J. Oropeza (2012). Jews, Gentiles, and the Opponents of Paul: Apostasy in the New Testament Communities, Volume 2: The Pauline Letters. Wipf & Stock Publishers. 
 B. J. Oropeza (2012). Churches under Siege of Persecution and Assimilation: Apostasy in the New Testament Communities, Volume 3: The General Epistles and Revelation. Wipf & Stock Publishers. 
 Scot McKnight (2013). A Long Faithfulness: The Case for Christian Perseverance, Patheos Press. .
 Robert E. Picirilli (2002). Grace, Faith, Free Will. Contrasting Views of Salvation: Calvinism and Arminianism. Randall House Publications. 
 Frederick W. Claybrook, Jr. (2003) Once Saved, Always Saved? A New Testament Study of Apostasy. University Press of America. 
 French L. Arrington (2005). Unconditional Eternal Security: Myth or Truth? Pathway Press. 

 Traditional Calvinist view

 G. C. Berkouwer (1958). Studies in Dogmatics: Faith and Perseverance. Wm. B. Eerdmans Publishing Company. 
 D. Martyn Lloyd-Jones (1976). Romans 8:17-39: The Final Perseverance of the Saints. Banner of Truth. 
 Judith M. Gundry (1991). Paul and Perseverance: Staying in and Falling Away. Westminster/John Knox. 
 Anthony A. Hoekema (1994). Saved by Grace. Wm. B. Eerdmans. 
 A. W. Pink (2001). Eternal Security. Sovereign Grace Publishers. 
 Thomas R. Schreiner & Ardel B. Caneday (2001). The Race Set Before Us: A Biblical Theology of Perseverance and Assurance. Inter-Varsity Press. 
 Alan P. Stanley (2007). Salvation is More Complicated Than You Think: A Study on the Teachings of Jesus. Authentic Publishing. 

 Non-traditional Calvinist or free grace view

 R. T. Kendall (1983, 1995). Once Saved, Always Saved. Authentic Media. 
 Zane C. Hodges (1989). Absolutely Free! A Biblical Reply to Lordship Salvation. Zondervan Publishers. 
 Charles C. Ryrie (1989, 1997). So Great Salvation: What it Means to Believe in Jesus Christ. Moody Publishers. 
 Charles Stanley (1990). Eternal Security: Can You Be Sure?. Oliver-Nelson Books. 
 Joseph C. Dillow (1992). The Reign of the Servant Kings: A Study of Eternal Security and the Final Significance of Man. Schoettle Publishing Company. 
 Norman L. Geisler (1999, 2001). Chosen But Free: A Balanced View of Divine Election, 2nd ed. Bethany House Publishers. 
 Tony Evans (2004). Totally Saved. Moody Publishers.

External links
 "Perseverance of the Saints: A History of the Doctrine" by John Jefferson Davis (a Traditional Calvinist)
 "Early Christian Writers on Apostasy and Perseverance" by Steve Witzki
 James Arminius: The Security of the Believer
 The Opinions of the Remonstrants (1618)
 The Arminian Confession of 1621 and Apostasy
 "Serious Thoughts Upon the Perseverance of the Saints" by John Wesley
 Arminian Responses to Key Passages Used to Support Perseverance of the Saints
 Arminian Responses to Calvinist Arguments for Perseverance of the Saints
 Scriptures Used to Support Conditional and Unconditional Security
 Saving Faith: Is it Simply the Act of a Moment or the Attitude of a Life?
 Saving Faith: The Attitude of a Life—the Scholarly Evidence
 Saving Faith According to the Greek New Testament
 See 13 part series on "Perseverance of the Saints" by Ben Henshaw
 The Orthodox Church Affirms Conditional Security
 Messianic Jewish theologian David Stern Affirms the Conditional Security of the Believer
 Messianic Jewish Scholar Dr. Michael Brown Affirms Conditional Security
 "A Synthetic Look at the Warning Passages in Hebrews" by New Testament Scholar Scot McKnight
 "Christian Apostasy and Hebrews 6" by Methodist Scholar Ben Witherington
 Hebrews 6:4-6 and the Possibility of Apostasy by Free Will Baptist Scholar Robert Picirilli
 Vic Reasoner: "Does God have an Eraser," Part 1 
 Vic Reasoner: "Does God have an Eraser," Part 2 
 See "The Society of Evangelical Arminians" for more articles dealing with the Calvinist and Arminian debate

Arminianism
Salvation in Protestantism
Methodism
Apostasy